= 2012 San Francisco 49ers season =

American football team season

- Owner: Jed York
- General manager: Trent Baalke
- Head coach: Jim Harbaugh
- Offensive coordinator: Greg Roman
- Defensive coordinator: Vic Fangio
- Home stadium: Candlestick Park

Results
- Record: 11–4–1
- Division place: 1st NFC West
- Playoffs: Won Divisional Playoffs (vs. Packers) 45–31; Won NFC Championship (at Falcons) 28–24; Lost Super Bowl XLVII (vs. Ravens) 31–34
- All-Pros: 10: G Mike Iupati (1st team); OLB Aldon Smith (1st team); ILB Patrick Willis (1st team); ILB NaVorro Bowman (1st team); S Dashon Goldson (1st team); P Andy Lee (1st team); T Joe Staley (2nd team); DE Justin Smith (2nd team); DT Justin Smith (2nd team); OLB Ahmad Brooks (2nd team)
- Pro Bowlers: 9: Selected but did not participate due to participation in Super Bowl XLVII: RB Frank Gore; T Joe Staley; G Mike Iupati; DE Justin Smith; OLB Aldon Smith; ILB Patrick Willis; ILB NaVorro Bowman; FS Dashon Goldson; SS Donte Whitner

Uniform
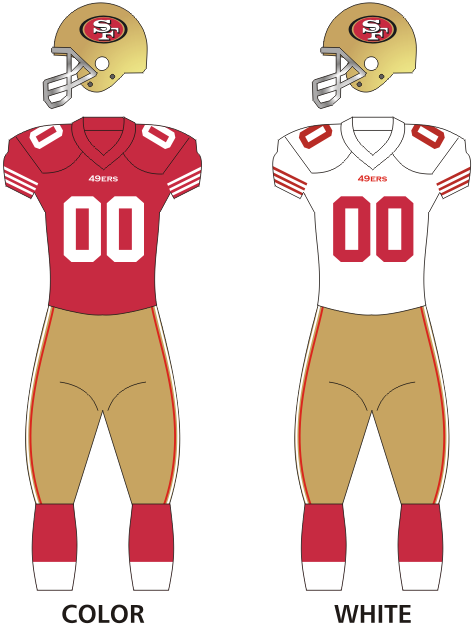

The 2012 season was the San Francisco 49ers' 63rd in the National Football League (NFL), their 67th overall, their second under the head coach/general manager tandem of Jim Harbaugh and Trent Baalke, and their penultimate season at Candlestick Park. After going 13–3 and reaching the NFC Championship the year before, the 49ers topped that success with their first NFC championship since 1994 as well as their sixth overall as a franchise, overcoming a 17–0 deficit to defeat the Atlanta Falcons 28–24 on January 20, 2013, in the NFC title game. However, the season ended with their first-ever defeat in the Super Bowl, losing 34–31 to the Baltimore Ravens. With that game, the Ravens replaced the 49ers as the only team with multiple appearances to never lose a Super Bowl; they have since been joined by the Tampa Bay Buccaneers in this capacity.

This season was also highlighted by the signing of star wide receiver Randy Moss, who had come out of retirement after initially retiring following the 2010 season. As a 49er, Moss appeared in his second Super Bowl but failed to win one again as he previously lost in Super Bowl XLII to the New York Giants when he was part of the 2007 New England Patriots.

== 2012 NFL draft ==
San Francisco 49ers 2012 NFL Draft selections
Draft order			Player name	Position	Height	Weight	College	Contract	Notes
Round	Choice	Overall	Player name	Position	Height	Weight	College	Contract	Notes
1	30	30	A. J. Jenkins	WR	6'0"	192 lbs.	Illinois	4 years	
2	29	61	LaMichael James	RB	5'8"	194 lbs.	Oregon	4 years	
3	29	92	Traded to the Indianapolis Colts ^{[a]}						
4	2	97	Traded to the Miami Dolphins ^{[b]}						From Colts^{[a]}
4	8	103	Traded to the Carolina Panthers ^{[c]}						From Dolphins^{[b]}
4	22	117	Joe Looney	OG	6'3"	309 lbs.	Wake Forest	4 years	From Lions^{[d]}
4	30	125	Traded to the Detroit Lions ^{[d]}						
5	30	165	Darius Fleming	OLB	6'2"	245 lbs.	Notre Dame	4 years	
6	10	180	Trenton Robinson	FS	5'10"	195 lbs.	Michigan State	4 years	From Panthers^{[c]}
6	26	196	Traded to the Detroit Lions ^{[d]}						From Dolphins^{[b]}
6	29	199	Jason Slowey	Center	6'3"	303 lbs.	Western Oregon	Released	
7	30	237	Cam Johnson	DE	6'3"	268 lbs.	Virginia	2 years	

NOTES
^{^[a]} The 49ers acquired this fourth-round selection from the Indianapolis Colts along with a 2013 fifth-round selection in exchange for a 2012 third-round selection (#92 overall; used to select WR T. Y. Hilton).
^{^[b]} The 49ers acquired this fourth-round selection from the Miami Dolphins along with a sixth-round selection (#196 overall) and a 2013 sixth-round selection, in exchange for a 2012 fourth-round selection (#97 overall; used to select RB Lamar Miller).
^{^[c]} The 49ers acquired the sixth-round selection from the Carolina Panthers along with a 2013 third-round selection in exchange for a 2012 fourth-round selection (#103 overall; used to select DE Frank Alexander).
^{^[d]} The 49ers acquired this fourth-round selection from the Detroit Lions in exchange for a 2012 fourth-round selection (#125 overall; used to select LB Ronnell Lewis)and a 2012 sixth-round selection (#196 overall; used to select DB Jonte Green).

== Staff ==
2012 San Francisco 49ers staff
Front office: Co-chairman – Denise DeBartolo York; Co-chairman – John York; CEO/Owner – Jed York; President/co-owner – Gideon Yu; general manager – Trent Baalke; Director of player personnel – Tom Gamble; Director of college scouting – Joel Patten; Director of football administration – Brian Hampton; Head coaches: Head coach – Jim Harbaugh; Offensive coaches: Offensive coordinator – Greg Roman; Quarterbacks – Geep Chryst; Running backs – Tom Rathman; Wide receivers – John Morton; Tight ends – Reggie Davis; Offensive line – Tim Drevno; Offensive line – Mike Solari; Offensive assistant – Michael Christianson; Offensive assistant – Ejiro Evero; Offensive assistant – Paul Wulff	Defensive coaches: Defensive coordinator – Vic Fangio; Defensive line – Jim Tomsula; Linebackers – Jim Leavitt; Secondary – Ed Donatell; Assistant secondary – Greg Jackson; Defensive assistant/quality control – Peter Hansen; Special teams coaches: Assistant head coach/special teams coordinator – Brad Seely; Special teams assistant – Tracy Smith; Strength and conditioning: Head strength and conditioning – Mark Uyeyama; Assistant strength and conditioning – Kevin Tolbert

== Final roster ==
2012 San Francisco 49ers roster
Quarterbacks (QB): 7 Colin Kaepernick; 11 Alex Smith; 3 Scott Tolzien; Running backs (RB): 24 Anthony Dixon; 21 Frank Gore; 33 Jewel Hampton; 23 LaMichael James; 49 Bruce Miller FB; Wide receivers (WR): 15 Michael Crabtree; 19 Ted Ginn Jr. RS; 17 A. J. Jenkins; 84 Randy Moss; Tight ends (TE): 81 Garrett Celek; 85 Vernon Davis; 46 Delanie Walker	Offensive linemen (OL): 75 Alex Boone G; 76 Anthony Davis T; 68 Leonard Davis G; 59 Jonathan Goodwin C; 77 Mike Iupati G; 67 Daniel Kilgore C; 66 Joe Looney G; 74 Joe Staley T; Defensive linemen (DL): 95 Ricky Jean Francois DE; 63 Tony Jerod-Eddie NT; 91 Ray McDonald DE; 90 Isaac Sopoaga NT; 94 Justin Smith DE; 92 Will Tukuafu DE; 93 Ian Williams NT	Linebackers (LB): 96 Eric Bakhtiari OLB; 53 NaVorro Bowman ILB; 55 Ahmad Brooks OLB; 56 Tavares Gooden ILB; 54 Larry Grant ILB; 51 Clark Haggans OLB; 50 Cam Johnson OLB; 99 Aldon Smith OLB; 57 Michael Wilhoite ILB; 52 Patrick Willis ILB; Defensive backs (DB): 26 Tramaine Brock CB; 25 Tarell Brown CB; 20 Perrish Cox CB; 29 Chris Culliver CB; 38 Dashon Goldson FS; 28 Darcel McBath SS; 30 Trenton Robinson SS; 22 Carlos Rogers CB; 27 C. J. Spillman FS; 31 Donte Whitner SS; Special teams (ST): 2 David Akers K; 86 Brian Jennings LS; 4 Andy Lee P	Practice squad: 92 Lamar Divens NT; 18 Ricardo Lockette WR; 65 Al Netter T; 14 Chad Hall WR; 35 Curtis Taylor S; 36 Michael Thomas S; 69 Kenny Wiggins G; Reserve: 83 Demarcus Dobbs TE (IR); 58 Darius Fleming OLB (PUP); 98 Parys Haralson OLB (IR); 32 Kendall Hunter RB (IR); 45 Brandon Jacobs RB (Susp.); 82 Mario Manningham WR (IR); 10 Kyle Williams WR (IR); Rookies in italics 53 active, 7 reserve, 7 practice squad

== Quarterback controversy ==
Quarterback Alex Smith missed two starts mid-season after suffering a concussion, and backup Colin Kaepernick successfully filled in. A quarterback controversy began. Smith was ranked third in the NFL in passer rating (104.1), led the league in completion percentage (70%), and had been 19–5–1 as a starter under Harbaugh, while Kaepernick was considered more dynamic with his scrambling ability and arm strength. After Smith was fully recovered, Harbaugh chose Kaepernick as the starter for the 8–2–1 49ers, but also stated that the assignment was week-to-week and not necessarily permanent. However, Kaepernick started the remainder of the season through Super Bowl XLVII. Smith was traded to Kansas City after the season.

== Preseason ==
Week	Date	Opponent	Result	Record	Venue	Recap
1	August 10	Minnesota Vikings	W 17–6	1–0	Candlestick Park	Recap
2	August 18	at Houston Texans	L 9–20	1–1	Reliant Stadium	Recap
3	August 26	at Denver Broncos	W 29–24	2–1	Sports Authority Field at Mile High	Recap
4	August 30	San Diego Chargers	W 35–3	3–1	Candlestick Park	Recap

== Regular season ==
Week	Date	Opponent	Result	Record	Venue	Recap
1	September 9	at Green Bay Packers	**W** 30–22	1–0	Lambeau Field	Recap
2	September 16	Detroit Lions	**W** 27–19	2–0	Candlestick Park	Recap
3	September 23	at Minnesota Vikings	**L** 13–24	2–1	Mall of America Field	Recap
4	September 30	at New York Jets	**W** 34–0	3–1	MetLife Stadium	Recap
5	October 7	Buffalo Bills	**W** 45–3	4–1	Candlestick Park	Recap
6	October 14	New York Giants	**L** 3–26	4–2	Candlestick Park	Recap
7	October 18	**Seattle Seahawks**	**W** 13–6	5–2	Candlestick Park	Recap
8	October 29	at **Arizona Cardinals**	**W** 24–3	6–2	University of Phoenix Stadium	Recap
9	Bye					
10	November 11	**St. Louis Rams**	**T** 24–24 (OT)	6–2–1	Candlestick Park	Recap
11	November 19	Chicago Bears	**W** 32–7	7–2–1	Candlestick Park	Recap
12	November 25	at New Orleans Saints	**W** 31–21	8–2–1	Mercedes-Benz Superdome	Recap
13	December 2	at **St. Louis Rams**	**L** 13–16 (OT)	8–3–1	Edward Jones Dome	Recap
14	December 9	Miami Dolphins	**W** 27–13	9–3–1	Candlestick Park	Recap
15	December 16	at New England Patriots	**W** 41–34	10–3–1	Gillette Stadium	Recap
16	December 23	at **Seattle Seahawks**	**L** 13–42	10–4–1	CenturyLink Field	Recap
17	December 30	**Arizona Cardinals**	**W** 27–13	11–4–1	Candlestick Park	Recap
Note: Intra-division opponents are in **bold** text.

=== Game summaries ===
==== Week 1 ====
Team	1	2	3	4	Total
• 49ers	3	13	7	7	30
Packers	0	7	0	15	22

- Date: September 9
- Location: Lambeau Field, Green Bay, Wisconsin
- Game start: 4:25 p.m. EDT
- Game attendance: 70,523
- Game weather: 72 °F (22 °C), Partly Cloudy
- Referee: David White
- TV announcers (Fox): Joe Buck, Troy Aikman, and Pam Oliver

Scoring summary
1	4:53	SF	David Akers 40-yard field goal	49ers 3–0
2	11:10	SF	Randy Moss 14-yard pass from Alex Smith (David Akers kick)	49ers 10–0
2	4:40	GB	Jermichael Finley 1 yard pass from Aaron Rodgers (Mason Crosby kick)	49ers 10–7
2	:55	SF	David Akers 44-yard field goal	49ers 13–7
2	:00	SF	David Akers 63-yard field goal	49ers 16–7
3	8:16	SF	Vernon Davis 4-yard pass from Alex Smith (David Akers kick)	49ers 23–7
4	11:16	GB	Randall Cobb 75-yard punt return (Jordy Nelson pass from Aaron Rodgers)	49ers 23–15
4	8:41	SF	Frank Gore 23-yard run (David Akers kick)	49ers 30–15
4	6:05	GB	James Jones 10-yard pass from Aaron Rodgers (Mason Crosby kick)	49ers 30–22

The 49ers started their season beating the Packers 30–22. This is the 49ers first win at Lambeau Field since 1990. With the win, the 49ers started their season 1–0. They'd be the last team to beat the Packers in their home opener until the 2026 Falcons.

==== Week 2 ====
Team	1	2	3	4	Total
Lions	6	0	3	10	19
• 49ers	7	7	3	10	27

- Date: September 16
- Location: Candlestick Park, San Francisco, California
- Game start: 5:20 p.m. PDT
- Game attendance: 69,732
- Game weather: 59 °F (15 °C), Sunny
- Referee: Matt Nicks
- TV announcers (NBC): Al Michaels, Cris Collinsworth, and Michele Tafoya

Scoring summary
1	12:25	SF	Vernon Davis 21-yard pass from Alex Smith (David Akers kick)	49ers 7–0
1	7:47	DET	Jason Hanson 38-yard field goal	49ers 7–3
1	6:43	DET	Jason Hanson 41-yard field goal	49ers 7–6
2	14:57	SF	Frank Gore 1 yard run (David Akers kick)	49ers 14–6
3	9:42	SF	David Akers 36-yard field goal	49ers 17–6
3	3:40	DET	Jason Hanson 40-yard field goal	49ers 17–9
4	14:42	SF	David Akers 48-yard field goal	49ers 20–9
4	9:16	DET	Jason Hanson 48-yard field goal	49ers 20–12
4	3:04	SF	Vernon Davis 23-yard pass from Alex Smith (David Akers kick)	49ers 27–12
4	1:29	DET	Brandon Pettigrew 9-yard pass from Matthew Stafford (Jason Hanson kick)	49ers 27–19

==== Week 3 ====
Team	1	2	3	4	Total
49ers	0	3	10	0	13
• Vikings	7	10	0	7	24

- Date: September 23
- Location: Mall of America Field at Hubert H. Humphrey Metrodome, Minneapolis, Minnesota
- Game start: 1:00 p.m. EDT
- Game attendance: 57,288
- Game weather: indoors (dome)
- Referee: Ken Roan
- TV announcers (Fox): Kenny Albert, Daryl Johnston, and Tony Siragusa

Scoring summary
1	7:20	MIN	Kyle Rudolph 1 yard pass from Christian Ponder (Blair Walsh kick)	Vikings 7–0
2	12:13	SF	David Akers 29-yard field goal	Vikings 7–3
2	5:29	MIN	Christian Ponder 23-yard run (Blair Walsh kick)	Vikings 14–3
2	:00	MIN	Blair Walsh 52-yard field goal	Vikings 17–3
3	12:46	SF	David Akers 29-yard field goal	Vikings 17–6
3	6:17	SF	Vernon Davis 1 yard pass from Alex Smith (David Akers kick)	Vikings 17–13
4	14:17	MIN	Kyle Rudolph 2-yard pass from Christian Ponder (Blair Walsh kick)	Vikings 24–13

==== Week 4 ====
Team	1	2	3	4	Total
• 49ers	0	10	7	17	34
Jets	0	0	0	0	0

- Date: September 30
- Location: MetLife Stadium, East Rutherford, New Jersey
- Game start: 1:00 p.m. EDT
- Game attendance: 79,088
- Game weather: 67 °F (19 °C), Partly Cloudy
- Referee: Tony Corrente
- TV announcers (Fox): Kenny Albert, Daryl Johnston, and Tony Siragusa

Scoring summary
2	13:37	SF	Colin Kaepernick 7-yard run (David Akers kick)	49ers 7–0
2	:00	SF	David Akers 36-yard field goal	49ers 10–0
3	2:49	SF	Frank Gore 2-yard run (David Akers kick)	49ers 17–0
4	14:46	SF	Carlos Rogers 51-yard fumble return (David Akers kick)	49ers 24–0
4	8:23	SF	David Akers 40-yard field goal	49ers 27–0
4	6:03	SF	Kendall Hunter 1 yard run (David Akers kick)	49ers 34–0

==== Week 5 ====
Team	1	2	3	4	Total
Bills	0	3	0	0	3
• 49ers	3	14	7	21	45

- Date: October 7
- Location: Candlestick Park, San Francisco, California
- Game start: 4:25 p.m. EDT
- Game attendance: 69,732
- Game weather: 68 °F (20 °C), Sunny
- Referee: Jerome Boger
- TV announcers (CBS): Kevin Harlan and Solomon Wilcots

Scoring summary
1	7:25	SF	David Akers 19-yard field goal	49ers 3–0
2	10:46	BUF	Rian Lindell 31-yard field goal	Tie 3–3
2	9:54	SF	Kyle Williams 43-yard pass from Alex Smith (David Akers kick)	49ers 10–3
2	:24	SF	Michael Crabtree 28-yard pass from Alex Smith (David Akers kick)	49ers 17–3
3	9:06	SF	Frank Gore 1 yard run (David Akers kick)	49ers 24–3
4	14:12	SF	Mario Manningham 10-yard pass from Alex Smith (David Akers kick)	49ers 31–3
4	9:55	SF	Colin Kaepernick 16-yard run (David Akers kick)	49ers 38–3
4	1:11	SF	Anthony Dixon 3-yard run (David Akers kick)	49ers 45–3

==== Week 6 ====
Team	1	2	3	4	Total
• Giants	0	10	13	3	26
49ers	3	0	0	0	3

- Date: October 14
- Location: Candlestick Park, San Francisco, California
- Game start: 4:25 p.m. EDT
- Game attendance: 69,732
- Game weather: 66 °F (19 °C), Sunny
- Referee: John Parry
- TV announcers (Fox): Joe Buck, Troy Aikman, and Pam Oliver

Scoring summary
1	2:00	SF	David Akers 42-yard field goal	49ers 3–0
2	10:04	NYG	Victor Cruz 6-yard pass from Eli Manning (Lawrence Tynes kick)	Giants 7–3
2	2:56	NYG	Lawrence Tynes 34-yard field goal	Giants 10–3
3	11:48	NYG	Ahmad Bradshaw 1 yard run (Lawrence Tynes kick)	Giants 17–3
3	9:51	NYG	Lawrence Tynes 30-yard field goal	Giants 20–3
3	6:10	NYG	Lawrence Tynes 22-yard field goal	Giants 23–3
4	1:56	NYG	Lawrence Tynes 32-yard field goal	Giants 26–3

==== Week 7 ====
Team	1	2	3	4	Total
Seahawks	3	3	0	0	6
• 49ers	3	0	7	3	13

- Date: October 18
- Location: Candlestick Park, San Francisco, California
- Game weather: 80 °F (27 °C), Sunny
- Referee: Walt Anderson
- TV announcers (NFLN): Brad Nessler, Mike Mayock, and Alex Flanagan

==== Week 8 ====
Team	1	2	3	4	Total
• 49ers	7	10	7	0	24
Cardinals	0	0	3	0	3

- Date: October 29
- Location: University of Phoenix Stadium, Glendale, Arizona
- Game attendance: 62,810
- Game weather: 90 °F (32 °C), Sunny
- Referee: Bill Leavy
- TV announcers (ESPN): Mike Tirico, Jon Gruden, and Lisa Salters

Alex Smith completed 18-of-19 passes for 232 yards and three touchdowns without an interception in a 24–3 Monday night win over Arizona. With the win, the 49ers went into their bye week at 6–2.

==== Week 10 ====
Team	1	2	3	4	OT	Total
Rams	14	0	3	7	0	24
49ers	0	7	0	17	0	24

- Date: November 11
- Location: Candlestick Park, San Francisco, California
- Game attendance: 69,732
- Game weather: 59 °F (15 °C), Sunny
- Referee: Clete Blakeman
- TV announcers (Fox): Chris Myers, Tim Ryan, and Jaime Maggio

Smith suffered a concussion in the second quarter, throwing a touchdown with blurred vision before exiting the game. He was replaced by Colin Kaepernick, and the game ended in a 24–24 tie.

With the tie game, the Niners' season stood at 6–2–1. This would also be the first NFL tie game since 2008 when the Bengals and Eagles played to a 13-point tie. This is also the first tie game between both the Rams and Niners since a 20–20 tie game in 1968.

==== Week 11 ====
Team	1	2	3	4	Total
Bears	0	0	7	0	7
• 49ers	10	10	7	5	32

- Date: November 19
- Location: Candlestick Park, San Francisco, California
- Game attendance: 69,732
- Game weather: 61 °F (16 °C), Cloudy
- Referee: Tony Corrente
- TV announcers (ESPN): Mike Tirico, Jon Gruden, and Lisa Salters

Kaepernick started his first NFL game with Smith out with a concussion from the previous week. Kaepernick completed 16 of 23 for 246 yards with two touchdowns and no interceptions in a 32–7 win against a strong Bears defense. 49ers head coach Jim Harbaugh spoke highly of Kaepernick's performance after the game, leaving open the possibility of Kaepernick continuing to start. "Usually tend to go with the guy who's got the hot hand, and we've got two quarterbacks that have got a hot hand," Harbaugh said. He dismissed any rule that a player should not lose their starting job due to an injury. With the win, the 49ers improved to 7–2–1.

==== Week 12 ====
Team	1	2	3	4	Total
• 49ers	7	7	14	3	31
Saints	7	7	7	0	21

- Date: November 25
- Location: Mercedes-Benz Superdome, New Orleans, Louisiana
- Game attendance: 73,147
- Game weather: indoors (dome)
- Referee: John Parry
- TV announcers (Fox): Joe Buck, Troy Aikman, and Pam Oliver

Smith was cleared to play the day before the game, but Harbaugh chose not to rush him back and again started Kaepernick. In a rematch of the 2011 playoffs against New Orleans, the 49ers won 31–21 with Kaepernick throwing for a touchdown and running for another. The 49ers defense also returned two Drew Brees interceptions for touchdowns. With the win, the Niners improved to 8–2–1 and also to 2–0 under Kaepernick as a starter.

==== Week 13 ====
Team	1	2	3	4	OT	Total
49ers	7	0	0	6	0	13
• Rams	0	0	2	11	3	16

- Date: December 2
- Location: Edward Jones Dome, St. Louis, Missouri
- Game attendance: 57,279
- Game weather: indoors (dome)
- Referee: Carl Cheffers
- TV announcers (Fox): Kenny Albert, Daryl Johnston, and Tony Siragusa

==== Week 14 ====
Team	1	2	3	4	Total
Dolphins	0	3	3	7	13
• 49ers	0	6	7	14	27

- Date: December 9
- Location: Candlestick Park, San Francisco, California
- Game attendance: 69,732
- Game weather: 63 °F (17 °C), Sunny
- Referee: Mike Carey
- TV announcers (CBS): Greg Gumbel and Dan Dierdorf

==== Week 15 ====
Team	1	2	3	4	Total
• 49ers	7	10	14	10	41
Patriots	0	3	7	24	34

- Date: December 16
- Location: Gillette Stadium, Foxborough, Massachusetts
- Game start: 8:20 p.m. EST
- Game attendance: 68,756
- Game weather: 34 °F (1 °C), Rain
- Referee: Ed Hochuli
- TV announcers (NBC): Al Michaels, Cris Collinsworth, and Michele Tafoya

The 49ers held on to win despite a furious Patriots rally where they erased a 31–3 San Francisco lead to tie the game. With the win the 49ers improved to 10–3–1 and became the only team in the NFC West to defeat all 4 AFC East teams. Kaepernick's starting record also improved to 4–1.

==== Week 16 ====
Team	1	2	3	4	Total
49ers	0	6	0	7	13
• Seahawks	14	14	7	7	42

- Date: December 23
- Location: CenturyLink Field, Seattle, Washington
- Game start: 8:20 p.m. EST
- Game attendance: 68,161
- Game weather: 45 °F (7 °C), Rain
- Referee: Bill Vinovich
- TV announcers (NBC): Al Michaels, Cris Collinsworth, and Michele Tafoya

The game was originally scheduled for 1:25 PM PST, but was flexed to the Sunday night slot, thus denying Fox a chance to air a game between the 49ers and Seahawks in 2012 as the game in Candlestick Park was played on a Thursday night.

==== Week 17 ====
Team	1	2	3	4	Total
Cardinals	3	3	0	7	13
• 49ers	0	7	10	10	27

- Date: December 30
- Location: Candlestick Park, San Francisco, California
- Game start: 4:25 p.m. EST
- Game attendance: 69,732
- Game weather: 55 °F (13 °C), Sunny
- Referee: Pete Morelli
- TV announcers (Fox): Gus Johnson, Charles Davis, and Kristina Pink

The Niners returned home for a Week 17 rematch against the Cardinals. Needing a win to capture the NFC West crown, the team would be down 3–0 after the first quarter. Up 7–6 at halftime, the Niners outscored the Cardinals 20–7 in the second half to win the game 27–13 and finished the season with their 2nd straight division title and the NFC's #2 seed with a record of 11–4–1 while going 5–2 under Kaepernick as a starter.

== Standings ==
NFC West
	W	L	T	PCT	DIV	CONF	PF	PA	STK
^{(2)} San Francisco 49ers	11	4	1	.719	3–2–1	7–4–1	397	273	W1
^{(5)} Seattle Seahawks	11	5	0	.688	3–3	8–4	412	245	W5
St. Louis Rams	7	8	1	.469	4–1–1	6–5–1	299	348	L1
Arizona Cardinals	5	11	0	.313	1–5	3–9	250	357	L2

== Postseason schedule ==
Round	Date	Opponent (seed)	Result	Record	Venue	Recap
Wild Card	First-round bye					
Divisional	January 12, 2013	Green Bay Packers (3)	W 45–31	1–0	Candlestick Park	Recap
NFC Championship	January 20, 2013	at Atlanta Falcons (1)	W 28–24	2–0	Georgia Dome	Recap
Super Bowl XLVII	February 3, 2013	vs. Baltimore Ravens (A4)	L 31–34	2–1	Mercedes-Benz Superdome	Recap

=== Game summaries ===
==== NFC Divisional Playoffs: vs. (3) Green Bay Packers ====
Team	1	2	3	4	Total
Packers	14	7	3	7	31
• 49ers	7	17	7	14	45

- Date: January 12
- Location: Candlestick Park, San Francisco, California
- Game start: 8:00 p.m. EST
- Game attendance: 69,732
- Game weather: 45 °F (7 °C) (Cloudy)
- Referee: Jerome Boger
- TV announcers (Fox): Joe Buck, Troy Aikman, Pam Oliver, and Erin Andrews

Scoring summary
1	12:48	GB	Sam Shields 52-yard interception return (Mason Crosby kick)	Packers 7–0
1	9:01	SF	Colin Kaepernick 20-yard run (David Akers kick)	Tie 7–7
1	:29	GB	DuJuan Harris 18-yard run (Mason Crosby kick)	Packers 14–7
2	10:59	SF	Michael Crabtree 12-yard pass from Colin Kaepernick (David Akers kick)	Tie 14–14
2	5:26	SF	Michael Crabtree 20-yard pass from Colin Kaepernick (David Akers kick)	49ers 21–14
2	2:33	GB	James Jones 20-yard pass from Aaron Rodgers (Mason Crosby kick)	Tie 21–21
2	:00	SF	David Akers 36-yard field goal	49ers 24–21
3	8:25	GB	Mason Crosby 31-yard field goal	Tie 24–24
3	7:07	SF	Colin Kaepernick 56-yard run (David Akers kick)	49ers 31–24
4	14:57	SF	Frank Gore 2-yard run (David Akers kick)	49ers 38–24
4	3:34	SF	Anthony Dixon 2-yard run (David Akers kick)	49ers 45–24
4	:57	GB	Greg Jennings 3-yard pass from Aaron Rodgers (Mason Crosby kick)	49ers 45–31

In his first career playoff game, 25-year-old 49ers quarterback Colin Kaepernick rushed for 181 yards and two touchdowns, setting both the NFL single-game record for rushing yards by a quarterback as well as the 49ers postseason record for rushing, regardless of position. He also passed for 263 yards and two scores. Overall, San Francisco racked up 579 yards, including a franchise record 323 rushing yards, and scored a touchdown in every quarter to earn their second consecutive trip to the NFC championship game.

However, Kaepernick didn't get off to a good start. Less than two minutes into the game, he threw a pass that was intercepted by Sam Shields and returned 52 yards for a touchdown. But he quickly rallied his team back, completing a 45-yard pass to running back Frank Gore before taking the ball into the end zone himself on a 20-yard run. Later in the period, Green Bay took a 14–7 lead with Aaron Rodgers' 44-yard completion to James Jones setting up an 18-yard touchdown run by DuJuan Harris. The Packers then forced a punt, but returner Jeremy Ross muffed the kick and C. J. Spillman recovered it for San Francisco on the Packers 9-yard line. Two plays later, Kaepernick tied the score at 14 with a 12-yard touchdown pass to Michael Crabtree. Then defensive back Tarell Brown intercepted a pass from Rodgers, setting up Kaepernick's second touchdown pass to Crabtree, this one from 20 yards out.

With 2:39 left in the half, Rodgers' 20-yard touchdown pass to Jones tied the score at 21. But on the 49ers next drive, a pair of runs by Kaepernick for gains of 19 and 17 yards enabled David Akers to kick a 36-yard field goal, sending the teams into their lockers rooms with San Francisco leading 24–21.

In the third quarter, Green Bay drove 76 yards in 9 plays, featuring a 30-yard reception by Greg Jennings and scored a Mason Crosby field goal. But the tie turned out to be short lived. On the third play of their next drive, Kaepernick faked a handoff, rolled right, and took off for a career long 56-yard touchdown run, retaking the lead at 31–24. Then after a punt, he completed a 44-yard pass to tight end Vernon Davis, setting up Gore's 2-yard touchdown run on the first play of the fourth quarter. Following another punt, Kaepernick led the 49ers back for more points, this time on a 93-yard drive. First he ran for a 16-yard gain, and later he completed a 17-yard throw to tight end Delanie Walker. On the next play, Gore's 26-yard burst moved the ball to the Packers 27-yard line. Anthony Dixon eventually finished the 11-play drive with a 2-yard touchdown run, making the score 45–24.

With under a minute left, Rodgers threw a 3-yard touchdown pass to Jennings, but any hope of a miracle comeback was dashed when Walker recovered the ensuing onside kick attempt.

Crabtree was the top receiver of the game, with 9 catches for 119 yards and two touchdowns. Gore rushed for 119 yards and a touchdown, while also catching two passes for 48 yards. Linebacker Patrick Willis had 7 tackles and a sack. Rodgers finished 26/39 for 257 yards and two touchdowns, with 1 interception, while also rushing for 28 yards. Kaepernick finished the game responsible for more yards gained (444) than the entire Packers team (352).

==== NFC Championship: at (1) Atlanta Falcons ====
Team	1	2	3	4	Total
• 49ers	0	14	7	7	28
Falcons	10	14	0	0	24

- Date: January 20
- Location: Georgia Dome, Atlanta, Georgia
- Game start: 3:00 p.m. EST
- Game weather: indoors (dome)
- Referee: Terry McAulay
- TV announcers (Fox): Joe Buck, Troy Aikman, Pam Oliver, and Erin Andrews

Scoring summary
1	11:24	ATL	Julio Jones 11-yard pass from Matt Ryan (Matt Bryant kick)	Falcons 7–0
1	3:20	ATL	Matt Bryant 35-yard field goal	Falcons 10–0
2	14:54	ATL	Julio Jones 20-yard pass from Matt Ryan (Matt Bryant kick)	Falcons 17–0
2	8:08	SF	LaMichael James 15-yard run (David Akers kick)	Falcons 17–7
2	1:55	SF	Vernon Davis 4-yard pass from Colin Kaepernick (David Akers kick)	Falcons 17–14
2	:25	ATL	Tony Gonzalez 10-yard pass from Matt Ryan (Matt Bryant kick)	Falcons 24–14
3	10:47	SF	Frank Gore 5-yard run (David Akers kick)	Falcons 24–21
4	8:23	SF	Frank Gore 9-yard run (David Akers kick)	49ers 28–24

San Francisco overcame a 17-point deficit, the largest comeback ever in an NFC championship game, to earn their sixth Super Bowl appearance in franchise history.

Atlanta dominated the first quarter, mainly on plays by receiver Julio Jones, who caught 5 passes in it for 100 yards, including a 46-yard touchdown catch on their opening drive, and a 27-yard reception on their next drive to set up a Matt Bryant field goal. Following a punt, Matt Ryan hit Roddy White for a 23-yard gain on the last play of the first quarter. Then he threw a 20-yard touchdown pass to Jones on the first play of the second, giving the Falcons a 17–0 lead.

This time San Francisco struck back with an 80-yard scoring drive, with Frank Gore rushing for 20 yards and Vernon Davis catching a pass for 27. LaMichael James finished the drive with a 15-yard touchdown run. Then after forcing a three-and-out, Colin Kaepernick rushed for 23 yards and completed three passes to Davis for 48 yards, the last a 4-yard touchdown pass to make the score 17–14. But Atlanta stormed back as Ryan completed five passes for double-digit gains on their next drive, the last one a 10-yard score to tight end Tony Gonzalez with 25 seconds left in the half.

The 49ers took the opening kickoff and drove 82 yards, with Kaepernick completing two passes to Randy Moss for 38 yards and one to tight end Delanie Walker for 20. Gore completed the drive with a 5-yard touchdown run, cutting their deficit to 24–21. On Atlanta's ensuing possession, defensive back Chris Culliver gave San Francisco a great chance to tie or take the lead by intercepting a pass from Ryan and returning it to the Falcons 25-yard line. But San Francisco failed to gain a first down and came up empty when David Akers hit the uprights on a 38-yard field goal try. Later on, the 49ers got another scoring opportunity when defensive lineman Aldon Smith recovered a fumble from Ryan on his own 40-yard line. They subsequently drove deep into Falcons territory, but once again they failed to score when defensive back Dunta Robinson stripped the ball from Michael Crabtree on the 1-yard line as he was trying to get in for the go-ahead score, and linebacker Stephen Nichols recovered it.

With 12 minutes left in regulation, Ted Ginn Jr.'s 20-yard punt return gave San Francisco the ball on the Falcons 38-yard line. Five plays later, Gore scored his second touchdown on a 9-yard run, giving the 49ers their first lead of the game at 28–24. Atlanta responded with a drive to the 49ers 13-yard line, but consecutive incompletions on third and fourth down caused a turnover on downs with just 1:13 left in the game.

Atlanta managed to force a punt and get the ball with 13 seconds to go. Ryan completed a pass to Jones on the final play, but he was tackled at the 49ers 35-yard line as time expired.

Kaepernick finished 16/21 for 233 yards and a touchdown, along with 21 rushing yards. Davis caught 5 passes for 106 yards and a score. Gore rushed for 90 yards and two touchdowns. Ryan completed 30 of 42 passes for 396 yards and three touchdowns, with one interception. Jones caught 11 passes for 182 yards and two touchdowns, while White had 7 receptions for 100 yards. Gonzalez caught 8 passes for 78 yards and a score.

==== Super Bowl XLVII: vs. (A4) Baltimore Ravens ====
Team	1	2	3	4	Total
• Ravens	7	14	7	6	34
49ers	3	3	17	8	31

- Date: February 3
- Location: Mercedes-Benz Superdome, New Orleans, Louisiana
- Game start: 6:30 p.m. EST
- Game weather: indoors (dome)
- Referee: Jerome Boger
- TV announcers (CBS): Jim Nantz, Phil Simms, Solomon Wilcots, and Steve Tasker

Scoring summary
1	10:36	BAL	Anquan Boldin 13-yard pass from Joe Flacco (Justin Tucker kick)	Ravens 7–0
1	3:58	SF	David Akers 36-yard field goal	Ravens 7–3
2	7:10	BAL	Dennis Pitta 1 yard pass from Joe Flacco (Justin Tucker kick)	Ravens 14–3
2	1:45	BAL	Jacoby Jones 56-yard pass from Joe Flacco (Justin Tucker kick)	Ravens 21–3
2	:00	SF	David Akers 27-yard field goal	Ravens 21–6
3	14:49	BAL	Jacoby Jones 108-yard kickoff return (Justin Tucker kick)	Ravens 28–6
3	7:20	SF	Michael Crabtree 31-yard pass from Colin Kaepernick (David Akers kick)	Ravens 28–13
3	4:59	SF	Frank Gore 6-yard run (David Akers kick)	Ravens 28–20
3	3:10	SF	David Akers 34-yard field goal	Ravens 28–23
4	12:54	BAL	Justin Tucker 19-yard field goal	Ravens 31–23
4	9:57	SF	Colin Kaepernick 15-yard run (pass failed)	Ravens 31–29
4	4:19	BAL	Justin Tucker 38-yard field goal	Ravens 34–29
4	:04	SF	Safety, Sam Koch ran out of end zone	Ravens 34–31

In what seemed like it would be a blowout win for the Ravens, the Niners rallied in the 2nd half. With the Ravens leading 28–6, Jacoby Jones returned a kickoff for a touchdown at the start of the 2nd half. For a period, the 49ers outscored the Ravens 25–6, and had a chance to take the lead late in the game. However, the Ravens defense was strong, stopping the 49ers offense at the 4-yard line and forcing a turnover on downs. This marked the first time ever in franchise history the Niners had lost a Super Bowl. This game became known as "The Harbowl", as it was the first time in Super Bowl history two brothers faced off against each other as coaches. Additionally, it was the first Super Bowl since Super Bowl XXXVII in 2003 to not feature Tom Brady, Ben Roethlisberger or Peyton Manning. This tradition would hold until Super Bowl LIV, which ironically also featured the 49ers.
