= 2011 San Francisco 49ers season =

American football team season

- Owner: Jed York
- General manager: Trent Baalke
- Head coach: Jim Harbaugh
- Offensive coordinator: Greg Roman
- Defensive coordinator: Vic Fangio
- Home stadium: Candlestick Park

Results
- Record: 13–3
- Division place: 1st NFC West
- Playoffs: Won Divisional Playoffs (vs. Saints) 36–32; Lost NFC Championship (vs. Giants) 17–20 (OT)
- All-Pros: 6: DT Justin Smith (1st team); ILB Patrick Willis (1st team); ILB NaVorro Bowman (1st team); K David Akers (1st team); P Andy Lee (1st team); DE Justin Smith (2nd team); CB Carlos Rogers (2nd team)
- Pro Bowlers: 9: RB Frank Gore; T Joe Staley; DE Justin Smith; ILB Patrick Willis; CB Carlos Rogers; FS Dashon Goldson; P Andy Lee; K David Akers; LS Brian Jennings

Uniform
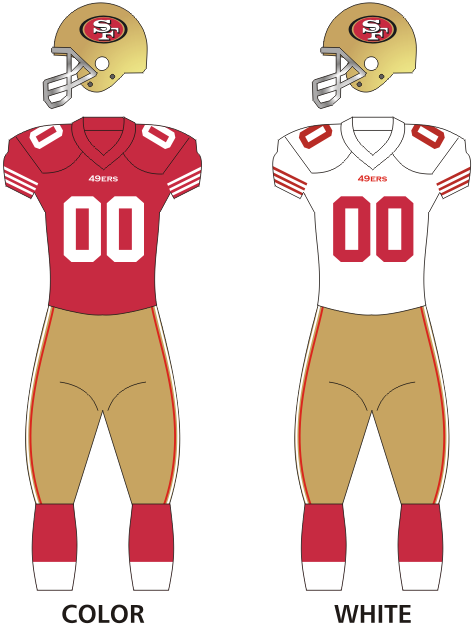

The 2011 season was the San Francisco 49ers' 62nd in the National Football League (NFL), their 66th overall, and their first under head coach Jim Harbaugh and general manager Trent Baalke. The 49ers rebounded from their disappointing 2010 season to end their streak of eight consecutive non-winning seasons. After defeating the St. Louis Rams in week 13 and attaining a 10–2 record, the team clinched the NFC West and made their first playoff appearance since 2002. The 49ers ended the regular season with a 13–3 record, their best since 1997, and earned a bye in the first round of the playoffs. In the Divisional Playoffs they defeated the New Orleans Saints 36–32 and were in the NFC Championship for the first time since 1997, where they lost to the rival and eventual Super Bowl champion New York Giants in overtime by a score of 20–17, coming just short of returning to the Super Bowl for the first time since 1994. This season began with the team's third head coach in four seasons.

One of the main catalysts for San Francisco's return to relevance in 2011 was the team's dominant defense—specifically against the run. The 49ers yielded the fewest rushing yards in the league (1,236), average yards per rush (3.5), and set an NFL record for fewest rushing touchdowns surrendered in a 16-game regular season (3). The team did not allow a single 100 yard rusher nor a rushing touchdown through the first 14 weeks, and only three of their opponents gained over 100 total yards on the ground. In addition to their dominance against the run, San Francisco's defense finished second in points allowed (229, or 14.3/g), fourth in yards allowed (308.1/g) second in team interceptions (23), and third in Pro Football Outsiders Defense-adjusted Value Over Average (DVOA) power rankings.

Despite their most successful season in years, the 49ers were 31st in the league in third down conversion percentage in the regular season (29.1) and were 17.9 percent in the playoffs and ranked 26th in total offense.

== Offseason ==
=== Coaching changes ===
Owner Jed York announced that he would hire a general manager and the new GM would make a decision on the new head coach to replace Mike Singletary after the 49ers' loss to the St. Louis Rams on December 26, 2010, that eliminated the team from the postseason. On January 5, the 49ers promoted the vice president of player personnel, Trent Baalke, to the position of general manager. On January 7, the 49ers hired Stanford head coach Jim Harbaugh to be the 18th head coach of the San Francisco 49ers.

With the hiring of a new head coach, many of the assistant coaches were replaced. Of the coordinators and position coaches from the previous season, only running backs coach Tom Rathman, defensive line coach Jim Tomsula, and offensive line coach Mike Solari were retained. The coaching staff featured Greg Roman as the new offensive coordinator and Vic Fangio as the new defensive coordinator, both previously assistant coaches under Harbaugh at Stanford. Former Cleveland Browns assistant head coach and special teams coordinator Brad Seely was hired for the same roles with the 49ers. Geep Chryst was the new quarterbacks coach, Reggie Davis was the new tight ends coach. John Morton was the new wide receivers coach, and Tim Drevno was a new offensive line coach to help out Mike Solari. Jim Leavitt was the new linebackers coach and Ed Donatell was the new secondary coach. The staff also featured defensive assistants Peter Hansen and Ejiro Evero, offensive assistant Bobby Engram, and special assistant to the head coach Bill Nayes.

=== Roster changes ===
==== Free agents ====
Position	Player	Tag	2011 Team	Notes and references
C	David Baas	UFA	New York Giants	
C	Tony Wragge	UFA	St. Louis Rams	
G	Chris Patrick	ERFA	Edmonton Eskimos	
T	Barry Sims	UFA	Free Agent	
QB	Alex Smith	UFA	San Francisco 49ers	
QB	Troy Smith	UFA	Omaha Nighthawks	
RB	Brian Westbrook	UFA	Free Agent	
DE	Demetric Evans	UFA	Free Agent	
DE	Ray McDonald	UFA	San Francisco 49ers	
LB	Travis LaBoy	UFA	San Diego Chargers	
NT	Aubrayo Franklin	UFA	New Orleans Saints	
LB	Manny Lawson	UFA	Cincinnati Bengals	
LB	Takeo Spikes	UFA	San Diego Chargers	
CB	William James	UFA		
S	Dashon Goldson	UFA	San Francisco 49ers	
S	C. J. Spillman	ERFA	San Francisco 49ers	
K	Jeff Reed	UFA	Seattle Seahawks	

Player re-signed by the 49ers

== 2011 NFL draft ==
San Francisco 49ers 2011 NFL Draft selections
Draft order			Player name	Position	Height	Weight	College	Contract	Notes
Round	Choice	Overall	Player name	Position	Height	Weight	College	Contract	Notes
1	7	7	Aldon Smith	DE	6'4"	263 lbs.	Missouri		
2	4	36	Colin Kaepernick	QB	6'4"	233 lbs.	Nevada		^{[e]}
3	12	80	Chris Culliver	CB	6'1"	201 lbs.	South Carolina		^{[f]}
4	11	108	Traded to the Denver Broncos ^{[e]}						
4	18	115	Kendall Hunter	RB	5'8"	190 lbs.	Oklahoma State		^{[a]}
5	10	141	Traded to the Denver Broncos ^{[e]}						
5	32	163	Daniel Kilgore	G	6'3"	308 lbs.	Appalachian State		^{[g]}
6	9	174	Traded to the Green Bay Packers^{[g]}						
6	17	182	Ronald Johnson	WR	6'1"	190 lbs.	University of Southern California		^{[f]}
6	25	190	Colin Jones	S	5'11"	200 lbs.	Texas Christian University		^{[b]}
7	8	211	Bruce Miller	FB	6'1"	254 lbs.	University of Central Florida		
7	28	231	Traded to the Green Bay Packers^{[c]}^{[g]}						
7	36	239	Mike Person	OT	6'4"	299 lbs.	Montana State		^{[d]}
7	47	250	Curtis Holcomb	CB	5'10"	184 lbs.	Florida A&M		^{[d]}

=== Draft notes ===
^{^[a]} The 49ers acquired this fourth-round selection from the San Diego Chargers along with a 2010 third-round selection (#91 overall; used to select LB NaVorro Bowman) and a 2010 sixth-round selection (#173 overall; used to select RB Anthony Dixon) in exchange for a 2010 third-round selection (#79 overall).
^{^[b]} The 49ers acquired this sixth-round selection from the Seattle Seahawks in exchange for DT Kentwan Balmer.
^{^[c]}The 49ers acquired this seventh-round selection from the Detroit Lions in exchange for QB Shaun Hill.
^{^[d]} Compensatory selection
^{^[e]} The 49ers acquired this second-round selection from the Denver Broncos in exchange for their second-round selection (#45 overall), a fourth-round selection (#108 overall), and a fifth-round selection (#141 overall).
^{^[f]} The 49ers acquired this third-round selection (#80 overall) and this sixth-round selection (#180 overall) from the Jacksonville Jaguars in exchange for their third-round selection (#76 overall).
^{^[g]} The 49ers acquired this fifth-round selection (#163 overall) from the Green Bay Packers in exchange for their sixth-round selection (#174 overall) and a seventh-round selection (#231 overall).

== Personnel ==
=== Staff ===
2011 San Francisco 49ers staff
Front office: Co-chairman – Denise DeBartolo York; Co-chairman – John York; CEO – Jed York; President/co-owner – Gideon Yu; General manager – Trent Baalke; Director of player personnel – Tom Gamble; Director of college scouting – Joel Patten; Director of football administration – Brian Hampton; Head coaches: Head coach – Jim Harbaugh; Offensive coaches: Offensive coordinator – Greg Roman; Quarterbacks – Geep Chryst; Running backs – Tom Rathman; Wide receivers – John Morton; Tight ends – Reggie Davis; Offensive line – Tim Drevno; Offensive line – Mike Solari; Offensive assistant – Bobby Engram	Defensive coaches: Defensive coordinator – Vic Fangio; Defensive line – Jim Tomsula; Linebackers – Jim Leavitt; Secondary – Ed Donatell; Assistant secondary – Greg Jackson; Special teams coaches: Assistant head coach/special teams coordinator – Brad Seely; Coaching assistant - Ejiro Evero; Strength and conditioning: Head strength and conditioning – Mark Uyeyama; Assistant strength and conditioning – Kevin Tolbert

=== Roster ===
2011 San Francisco 49ers roster
Quarterbacks (QB): 7 Colin Kaepernick; 11 Alex Smith; 3 Scott Tolzien; Running backs (RB): 24 Anthony Dixon; 21 Frank Gore; 32 Kendall Hunter; 49 Bruce Miller FB; 44 Moran Norris FB; Wide receivers (WR): 15 Michael Crabtree; 19 Ted Ginn Jr. RS; 13 Joe Hastings; 18 Brett Swain; 10 Kyle Williams; Tight ends (TE): 85 Vernon Davis; 81 Justin Peelle; 46 Delanie Walker	Offensive linemen (OL): 75 Alex Boone T; 76 Anthony Davis T; 59 Jonathan Goodwin C; 77 Mike Iupati G; 67 Daniel Kilgore C; 78 Mike Person G/T; 62 Chilo Rachal G; 68 Adam Snyder G; 74 Joe Staley T; Defensive linemen (DL): 96 Demarcus Dobbs DE; 95 Ricky Jean Francois DE; 91 Ray McDonald DE; 94 Justin Smith DE; 90 Isaac Sopoaga NT; 93 Ian Williams NT	Linebackers (LB): 53 NaVorro Bowman ILB; 55 Ahmad Brooks OLB; 51 Blake Costanzo ILB; 56 Tavares Gooden ILB; 54 Larry Grant ILB; 98 Parys Haralson OLB; 99 Aldon Smith OLB; 52 Patrick Willis ILB; Defensive backs (DB): 26 Tramaine Brock CB; 25 Tarell Brown CB; 29 Chris Culliver CB; 38 Dashon Goldson FS; 43 Colin Jones FS; 22 Carlos Rogers CB; 30 Reggie Smith SS; 36 Shawntae Spencer CB; 27 C. J. Spillman SS; 31 Donte Whitner SS; 20 Madieu Williams FS; Special teams (ST): 2 David Akers K; 86 Brian Jennings LS; 4 Andy Lee P	Practice squad: 61 Chase Beeler C; 71 Derek Hall T; 87 John Matthews WR; 23 Cory Nelms CB; 48 Konrad Reuland TE; 47 Monte Simmons LB; 57 Michael Wilhoite LB; Reserve: 82 Nate Byham TE (IR); 84 Josh Morgan WR (IR); 92 Will Tukuafu DE (IR); Rookies in italics 53 active, 3 reserve, 7 practice squad

==== Notes ====
Wide receiver Braylon Edwards was released after nine games.

== Preseason ==
=== Schedule ===
Week	Date	Opponent	Result	Record	Venue	Recap
1	August 12	at New Orleans Saints	L 3–24	0–1	Louisiana Superdome	Recap
2	August 20	Oakland Raiders *	W 17–3	1–1	Candlestick Park	Recap
3	August 27	Houston Texans	L 7–30	1–2	Candlestick Park	Recap
4	September 1	at San Diego Chargers	W 20–17	2–2	Qualcomm Stadium	Recap

=== Candlestick Park incident ===
- The preseason game against the Raiders was marked by brawls in the stands and a major beating in a restroom at Candlestick Park. Because of this, the NFL officially canceled all future preseason games between the two teams. They now only meet in the regular season every four years when the NFC West plays the AFC West, or in the Super Bowl.

== Regular season ==
=== Schedule ===
Week	Date	Opponent	Result	Record	Venue	Recap
1	September 11	**Seattle Seahawks**	**W** 33–17	1–0	Candlestick Park	Recap
2	September 18	Dallas Cowboys	**L** 24–27 (OT)	1–1	Candlestick Park	Recap
3	September 25	at Cincinnati Bengals	**W** 13–8	2–1	Paul Brown Stadium	Recap
4	October 2	at Philadelphia Eagles	**W** 24–23	3–1	Lincoln Financial Field	Recap
5	October 9	Tampa Bay Buccaneers	**W** 48–3	4–1	Candlestick Park	Recap
6	October 16	at Detroit Lions	**W** 25–19	5–1	Ford Field	Recap
7	Bye					
8	October 30	Cleveland Browns	**W** 20–10	6–1	Candlestick Park	Recap
9	November 6	at Washington Redskins	**W** 19–11	7–1	FedExField	Recap
10	November 13	New York Giants	**W** 27–20	8–1	Candlestick Park	Recap
11	November 20	**Arizona Cardinals**	**W** 23–7	9–1	Candlestick Park	Recap
12	November 24	at Baltimore Ravens	**L** 6–16	9–2	M&T Bank Stadium	Recap
13	December 4	**St. Louis Rams**	**W** 26–0	10–2	Candlestick Park	Recap
14	December 11	at **Arizona Cardinals**	**L** 19–21	10–3	University of Phoenix Stadium	Recap
15	December 19	Pittsburgh Steelers	**W** 20–3	11–3	Candlestick Park	Recap
16	December 24	at **Seattle Seahawks**	**W** 19–17	12–3	CenturyLink Field	Recap
17	January 1, 2012	at **St. Louis Rams**	**W** 34–27	13–3	Edward Jones Dome	Recap
Note: Intra-division opponents are in **bold** text.

=== Game summaries ===
==== Week 1: vs. Seattle Seahawks ====
Week One: Seattle Seahawks at San Francisco 49ers – Game summary

Quarter	1	2	3	4	Total
Seahawks	0	0	7	10	**17**
**49ers**	0	16	0	17	**33**

at Candlestick Park, San Francisco, California

- Date: September 11
- Game time: 1:15 p.m. PDT
- Game weather: 72 °F (22 °C) (Partly Cloudy)
- Game attendance: 69,732
- Referee: Jeff Triplette
- TV announcers (Fox): Dick Stockton, John Lynch and Jaime Maggio

Game information

**First quarter**

- No scoring plays.

**Second quarter**

- SF – David Akers 27 yd. Field Goal, 49ers 3–0.
- SF – David Akers 24 yd. Field Goal, 49ers 6–0.
- SF – David Akers 31 yd. Field Goal, 49ers 9–0.
- SF – Alex Smith 1 yd. run (David Akers kick), 49ers 16–0.

**Third quarter**

- SEA – Golden Tate 8 yd. pass from Tarvaris Jackson (Steven Hauschka kick), 49ers 16–7.

**Fourth quarter**

- SEA – Steven Hauschka 39 yd. Field Goal, 49ers 16–10.
- SF – David Akers 18 yd. Field Goal, 49ers 19–10.
- SEA – Doug Baldwin 55 yd. pass from Tarvaris Jackson (Steven Hauschka kick), 49ers 19–17.
- SF – Ted Ginn 102 yd. kickoff return (David Akers kick), 49ers 26–17.
- SF – Ted Ginn 55 yd. punt return (David Akers kick), 49ers 33–17.

**Top passers**

- SEA – Tarvaris Jackson – 21/37, 197 yards, 2 touchdowns, 1 interception
- SF – Alex Smith – 15/20, 124 yards

**Top rushers**

- SEA – Marshawn Lynch – 13 carries, 33 yards
- SF – Frank Gore – 22 carries, 59 yards

**Top receivers**

- SEA – Doug Baldwin – 4 receptions, 83 yards, 1 touchdown
- SF – Vernon Davis – 5 receptions, 47 yards

**Top tacklers**

- SEA – Kam Chancellor – 10 tackles
- SF – NaVorro Bowman – 7 tackles

With the win, the 49ers started the season 1–0. As of 2026, this is the last time the 49ers returned a punt for a touchdown.

==== Week 2: vs. Dallas Cowboys ====
Week Two: Dallas Cowboys at San Francisco 49ers – Game summary

Quarter	1	2	3	4	OT	Total
**Cowboys**	0	7	7	10	3	**27**
49ers	0	14	7	3	0	**24**

at Candlestick Park, San Francisco, California

- Date: September 18
- Game time: 1:05 pm. PDT
- Game weather: 77 °F (25 °C) (Sunny)
- Game attendance: 69,732
- Referee: Ron Winter
- TV announcers (Fox): Thom Brennaman, Brian Billick and Laura Okmin

Game information

**First quarter**

- No Scoring

**Second quarter**

- SF – Frank Gore 1 yd. run (David Akers kick), 49ers 7–0
- SF – Kyle Williams 12 yd. pass from Alex Smith (David Akers kick), 49ers 14–0
- DAL – Miles Austin 53 yd. pass from Tony Romo (Dan Bailey kick), 49ers 14–7

**Third quarter**

- DAL – Miles Austin 5 yd. pass from Jon Kitna (Dan Bailey kick), Tied 14–14
- SF – Delanie Walker 29 yd. pass from Alex Smith (David Akers kick), 49ers 21–14

**Fourth quarter**

- SF – David Akers 55 yd. Field Goal, 49ers 24–14
- DAL – Miles Austin 25 yd. pass from Tony Romo (Dan Bailey kick), 49ers 24–21
- DAL – Dan Bailey 48 yd. Field Goal, Tied 24–24

**Overtime**

- DAL – Dan Bailey 19 yd. Field Goal, Cowboys 27–24

**Top passers**

- DAL – Tony Romo – 20/33, 345 yards, 2 touchdowns
- SF – Alex Smith – 16/24, 179 yards, 2 touchdowns, 1 interception

**Top rushers**

- DAL – Felix Jones – 9 carries, 25 yards
- SF – Frank Gore – 20 carries, 47 yards

**Top receivers**

- DAL – Miles Austin – 9 receptions, 143 yards, 3 touchdowns
- SF – Ted Ginn Jr. – 4 receptions, 38 yards

**Top tacklers**

- DAL – Sean Lee – 9 tackles, 1 assist
- SF – NaVorro Bowman – 10 tackles, 1 assist

With the loss, the 49ers fell to 1–1.

==== Week 3: at Cincinnati Bengals ====
Week Three: San Francisco 49ers at Cincinnati Bengals – Game summary

Quarter	1	2	3	4	Total
**49ers**	0	0	3	10	**13**
Bengals	3	0	0	5	**8**

at Paul Brown Stadium, Cincinnati, Ohio

- Date: September 25
- Game time: 1:00 p.m. EDT/10:00 am. PDT
- Game weather: 71 °F (22 °C) (Partly Cloudy)
- Game attendance: 43,363
- Referee: Jerome Boger
- TV announcers (Fox): Ron Pitts, Jim Mora, Jr. and Jennifer Hale

Game information

**First quarter**

- CIN – Mike Nugent 22 yd. Field Goal, Bengals 3–0

**Second quarter**

- No Scoring

**Third quarter**

- SF – David Akers 23 yd. Field Goal, Tied 3–3

**Fourth quarter**

- CIN – Mike Nugent 23 yd. Field Goal, Bengals 6–3
- SF – Kendall Hunter 7 yd. run (David Akers kick) 49ers 10–6
- SF – David Akers 53 yd. Field Goal, 49ers 13–6
- CIN – Andy Lee run out of bounds for a safety, 49ers 13–8

**Top passers**

- SF – Alex Smith – 20/30, 201 YDS, 0 TD, 0 INT
- CIN – Andy Dalton – 17/32, 157 YDS, 0 TD, 2 INT

**Top rushers**

- SF – Frank Gore – 17 CAR, 42 YDS
- CIN – Cedric Benson – 17 CAR, 64 YDS

**Top receivers**

- SF – Vernon Davis – 8 REC, 114 YDS
- CIN – Andre Caldwell – 6 REC, 53 YDS

**Top tacklers**

- SF – NaVorro Bowman – 7 TKL, 4 AST
- CIN – Reggie Nelson – 7 TKL, 2 AST

With the win, the 49ers improved to 2–1.

==== Week 4: at Philadelphia Eagles ====
Week Four: San Francisco 49ers at Philadelphia Eagles – Game summary

Quarter	1	2	3	4	Total
**49ers**	0	3	14	7	**24**
Eagles	7	13	3	0	**23**

at Lincoln Financial Field, Philadelphia, Pennsylvania

- Date: October 2
- Game time: 1:00 pm. EDT/10:00 am. PDT
- Game weather: 54 °F (12 °C) (Cloudy)
- Game attendance: 69,144
- Referee: Alberto Riveron
- TV announcers (Fox): Ron Pitts and Jim Mora, Jr.

Game information

**First quarter**

- PHI – Clay Horbor 16 yd. pass from Michael Vick (Alex Henery kick), Eagles 7–0

**Second quarter**

- SF – David Akers 37 yd. Field Goal, Eagles 7–3
- PHI – Alex Henery 32 yd. Field Goal, Eagles 10–3
- PHI – Alex Henery 32 yd. Field Goal, Eagles 13–3
- PHI – LeSean McCoy 5 yd. pass from Michael Vick (Alex Henery kick), Eagles 20–3

**Third quarter**

- PHI – Alex Henery 33 yd. Field Goal, Eagles 23–3
- SF – Josh Morgan 30 yd. pass from Alex Smith (David Akers kick), Eagles 23–10
- SF – Vernon Davis 9 yd. pass from Alex Smith (David Akers kick), Eagles 23–17

**Fourth quarter**

- SF – Frank Gore 12 yd. run (David Akers kick), 49ers 24–23

**Top passers**

- SF – Alex Smith – 21/33, 291 yards, 2 touchdowns
- PHI – Michael Vick – 30/46, 416 yards, 2 touchdowns, 1 interception

**Top rushers**

- SF – Frank Gore – 15 carries, 127 yards
- PHI – Michael Vick – 8 carries, 75 yards

**Top receivers**

- SF – Michael Crabtree – 5 receptions, 68 yards
- PHI – DeSean Jackson – 6 rceptions, 171 yards

**Top tacklers**

- SF – Dashon Goldson – 10 tackles
- PHI – Jamar Chaney – 6 tackles, 2 assists

With the comeback win, the 49ers improved to 3–1.

==== Week 5: vs. Tampa Bay Buccaneers ====
Week Five: Tampa Bay Buccaneers at San Francisco 49ers – Game summary

Quarter	1	2	3	4	Total
Buccaneers	3	0	0	0	**3**
**49ers**	7	17	10	14	**48**

at Candlestick Park, San Francisco, California

- Date: October 9
- Game time: 1:05 pm. PDT
- Game weather: 63 °F (17 °C) (Sunny)
- Game attendance: 69,732
- Referee: Terry McAulay
- TV announcers (Fox): Kenny Albert, Daryl Johnston and Tony Siragusa

Game information

**First quarter**

- SF – Delanie Walker 26 yd. pass from Alex Smith (David Akers kick), 49ers 7–0
- TB – Connor Barth 24 yd. Field Goal, 49ers 7–3

**Second quarter**

- SF – Carlos Rogers 31 yd. interception return (David Akers kick), 49ers 14–3
- SF – Frank Gore 2 yd. run (David Akers kick), 49ers 21–3
- SF – David Akers 37 yd. Field Goal, 49ers 24–3

**Third quarter**

- SF – Vernon Davis 23 yd. pass from Alex Smith (David Akers kick), 49ers 31–3
- SF – David Akers 27 yd. Field Goal, 49ers 34–3

**Fourth quarter**(David Akers kick)

- SF – Vernon Davis 14 yd. pass from Alex Smith (David Akers kick), 49ers 41–3
- SF – Anthony Dixon 1 yd. run (David Akers kick), 49ers 48–3

**Top passers**

- TB – Josh Freeman – 17/33, 187 yards, 2 interceptions
- SF – Alex Smith – 11/19, 170 yards, 3 touchdowns, 0 interceptions

**Top rushers**

- TB – LeGarrette Blount – 10 rushes, 34 yards
- SF – Frank Gore – 20 rushes, 125 yards, 1 touchdown

**Top receivers**

- TB – Kellen Winslow – 5 receptions, 54 yards
- SF – Josh Morgan – 5 receptions, 75 yards

**Top tacklers**

- TB – Sean Jones – 8 tackles
- SF – Patrick Willis – 10 tackles, 2 assists

With the win, the 49ers improved to 4–1.

==== Week 6: at Detroit Lions ====
Week Six: San Francisco 49ers at Detroit Lions – Game summary

Quarter	1	2	3	4	Total
**49ers**	0	12	3	10	**25**
Lions	10	0	3	6	**19**

at Ford Field, Detroit, Michigan

- Date: October 16
- Game time: 1:00 pm. EDT/10:00 am. PDT
- Game weather: Played indoors (dome stadium)
- Game attendance: 62,061
- Referee: Mike Carey
- TV announcers (Fox): Kenny Albert, Daryl Johnston and Tony Siragusa
- Recap
  Gamebook

Game information

**First quarter**

- DET – Jason Hanson 25-yard field goal, Lions 3–0, **Drive: 5 plays, 25 yards, 2:01.**
- DET – Brandon Pettigrew 16-yard pass from Matthew Stafford (Jason Hanson kick), Lions 10–0, **Drive: 7 plays, 69 yards, 3:02.**

**Second quarter**

- SF – Frank Gore 1-yard run (David Akers kick), Lions 10–7, **Drive: 8 plays, 80 yards, 4:47.**
- SF – Matthew Stafford sacked by Aldon Smith and Ray McDonald in end zone for −11 yards, Lions 10–9, **Drive: 2 plays, −11 yards, 0:05.**
- SF – David Akers 55-yard field goal, 49ers 12–10, **Drive: 4 plays, 21 yards, 0:55.**

**Third quarter**

- DET – Jason Hanson 24-yard field goal, Lions 13–12, **Drive: 7 plays, 54 yards, 2:12.**
- SF – David Akers 31-yard field goal, 49ers 15–13, **Drive: 6 plays, 67 yards, 2:18.**

**Fourth quarter**

- DET – Nate Burleson 5-yard pass from Matthew Stafford, Lions 19–15, **Drive: 8 plays, 49 yards, 2:55.**
- SF – Delanie Walker 6-yard pass from Alex Smith (David Akers kick), 49ers 22–19, **Drive: 8 plays, 35 yards, 3:33.**
- SF – David Akers 37-yard field goal, 49ers 25–19, **Drive: 4 plays, 6 yards, 0:14.**

**Top passers**

- SF – Alex Smith – 17/32, 125 yards, 1 touchdown, 1 interception
- DET – Matthew Stafford – 28/50, 293 yards, 2 touchdowns

**Top rushers**

- SF – Frank Gore – 15 carries, 141 yards, 1 touchdown
- DET – Jahvid Best – 12 carries, 37 yards

**Top receivers**

- SF – Michael Crabtree – 9 receptions, 77 yards
- DET – Calvin Johnson – 7 receptions, 113 yards

**Top tacklers**

- SF – Navarro Bowman – 8 tackles, 5 assists
- DET – DeAndre Levy – 7 tackles, 5 assists

With the win, the 49ers went into their bye week at 5–1.

==== Week 8: vs. Cleveland Browns ====
Week Eight: Cleveland Browns at San Francisco 49ers – Game summary

Quarter	1	2	3	4	Total
Browns	0	3	0	7	**10**
**49ers**	10	7	0	3	**20**

at Candlestick Park, San Francisco, California

- Date: October 30
- Game time: 1:15 pm. PDT
- Game weather: 74 °F (23 °C) (Sunny)
- Game attendance: 69,732
- Referee: Bill Leavy
- TV announcers (CBS): Ian Eagle and Dan Fouts

Game information

**First quarter**

- SF – Frank Gore 4 yd. run (David Akers kick), 49ers 7–0
- SF – David Akers 29 yd. Field Goal, 49ers 10–0

**Second quarter**

- SF – Michael Crabtree 2 yd. pass from Alex Smith (David Akers kick), 49ers 17–0
- CLE – Phil Dawson 52 yd. Field Goal, 49ers 17–3

**Third quarter**

- No Scoring

**Fourth quarter**

- CLE – Joshua Cribbs 45 yd. pass from Colt McCoy (Phil Dawson kick), 49ers 17–10
- SF – David Akers 26 yd. Field Goal, 49ers 20–10

**Top passers**

- CLE – Colt McCoy – 22/34, 241 yards, 1 touchdown, 1 interception
- SF – Alex Smith – 15/24, 177 yards, 1 touchdown

**Top rushers**

- CLE – Chris Ogbonnaya – 11 carries, 37 yards
- SF – Frank Gore – 31 carries, 134 yards

**Top receivers**

- CLE – Jordan Norwood – 5 receptions, 32 yards
- SF – Michael Crabtree – 5 receptions, 54 yards, 1 touchdown

**Top tacklers**

- CLE – D'Qwell Jackson – 11 tackles
- SF – NaVorro Bowman – 11 tackles, 1 assist

With the win, the 49ers improved to 6–1.

==== Week 9: at Washington Redskins ====
Week Nine: San Francisco 49ers at Washington Redskins – Game summary

Quarter	1	2	3	4	Total
**49ers**	0	13	3	3	**19**
Redskins	0	3	0	8	**11**

at FedExField, Landover, Maryland

- Date: November 6
- Game time: 1:00 pm. EST/10:00 am. PST
- Game weather: 56 °F (13 °C) (Sunny)
- Game attendance: 78,032
- Referee: Gene Steratore
- TV announcers (Fox): Kenny Albert, Daryl Johnston and Tony Siragusa

Game information

**First quarter**

- No Scoring

**Second quarter**

- SF – David Akers 52 yd. Field Goal, 49ers 3–0
- SF – David Akers 34 yd. Field Goal, 49ers 6–0
- SF – Bruce Miller 30 yd. pass from Alex Smith (David Akers kick), 49ers 13–0
- WAS – Graham Gano 59 yd. Field Goal, 49ers 13–3

**Third quarter**

- SF – David Akers 45 yd. Field Goal, 49ers 16–3

**Fourth quarter**

- SF – David Akers 20 yd. Field Goal, 49ers 19–3
- WAS – Jabar Graffney 9 yd. pass from John Beck (Leonard Hankerson pass from John Beck), 49ers 19–11

**Top passers**

- SF – Alex Smith – 17/24, 200 yards, 1 touchdown
- WAS – John Beck – 30/47, 254 yards, 1 touchdown, 1 interception

**Top rushers**

- SF – Frank Gore – 19 carries, 107 yards
- WAS – Roy Helu – 10 carries, 41 yards

**Top receivers**

- SF – Michael Crabtree – 5 receptions, 51 yards
- WAS – Roy Helu – 14 receptions, 105 yards

**Top tacklers**

- SF – Patrick Willis – 9 tackles, 4 assists
- WAS – Reed Doughty – 6 tackles, 5 assists

With the win, the 49ers improved to 7–1.

==== Week 10: vs. New York Giants ====
Week Ten: New York Giants at San Francisco 49ers – Game summary

Quarter	1	2	3	4	Total
Giants	3	3	7	7	**20**
**49ers**	3	6	3	15	**27**

at Candlestick Park, San Francisco, California

- Date: November 13
- Game time: 1:15 pm. PST
- Game weather: 62 °F (17 °C) (Partly Cloudy)
- Game attendance: 69,732
- Referee: Tony Corrente
- TV announcers (Fox): Joe Buck, Troy Aikman and Pam Oliver

Game information

**First quarter**

- NYG – Lawerence Tynes 23 yd. Field Goal, Giants 3–0
- SF – David Akers 36 yd. Field Goal, Tied 3–3

**Second quarter**

- NYG – Lawerence Tynes 25 yd. Field Goal, Giants 6–3
- SF – David Akers 52 yd. Field Goal, Tied 6–6
- SF – David Akers 39 yd. Field Goal, 49ers 9–6

**Third quarter**

- SF – David Akers 28 yd. Field Goal, 49ers 12–6
- NYG – Mario Manningham 13 yd. pass from Eli Manning (Lawerence tynes kick), Giants 13–12

**Fourth quarter**

- SF – Vernon Davis 31 yd. pass from Alex Smith (Michael Crabtree pass from Alex Smith), 49ers 20–13
- SF – Kendall Hunter 17 yd. run (David Akers kick), 49ers 27–13
- NYG – Hakeem Nicks 32 yd. pass from Eli Manning (Lawerence Tynes kick), 49ers 27–20

**Top passers**

- NYG – Eli Manning – 26/40, 311 YDS, 2 TD, 2 INT
- SF – Alex Smith – 19/30, 242 YDS, TD, INT

**Top rushers**

- NYG – Brandon Jacobs – 18 CAR, 55 YDS
- SF – Kendall Hunter – 6 CAR, 40 YDS, TD

**Top receivers**

- NYG – Victor Cruz – 6 REC, 84 YDS
- SF – Delanie Walker – 6 REC, 69 YDS

**Top tacklers**

- NYG – Kenny Phillips/Antrel Rolle – 4 TKL, AST each
- SF – NaVorro Bowman – 10 TKL, 4 AST

With the win, the 49ers improved to 8–1.

==== Week 11: vs. Arizona Cardinals ====
Week Eleven: Arizona Cardinals at San Francisco 49ers – Game summary

Quarter	1	2	3	4	Total
Cardinals	0	0	0	7	**7**
**49ers**	6	3	14	0	**23**

at Candlestick Park, San Francisco, California

- Date: November 20
- Game time: 1:05 pm. PST
- Game weather: 52 °F (11 °C) (Light Rain)
- Game attendance: 69,732
- Referee: Pete Morelli
- TV announcers (Fox): Thom Brennaman, Brian Billick and Laura Okmin

Game information

**First quarter**

- SF – David Akers 22 yd. Field Goal, 49ers 3–0
- SF – David Akers 43 yd. Field Goal, 49ers 6–0

**Second quarter**

- SF – David Akers 29 yd. Field Goal, 49ers 9–0

**Third quarter**

- SF – Kyle Williams 8 yd. pass from Alex Smith (David Akers kick), 49ers 16–0
- SF – Vernon Davis 18 yd. pass from Alex Smith (David Akers kick), 49ers 23–0

**Fourth quarter**

- ARI – Larry Fitzgerald 23 yd. pass from Richard Bartel (Jay Feely kick), 49ers 23–7

**Top passers**

- ARI – Ricahrd Bartel – 8/16, 64 yards, 1 touchdown
- SF – Alex Smith – 20/38, 267 yards, 2 touchdowns, 1 interception

**Top rushers**

- ARI – Chris Wells – 8 carries, 33 yards
- SF – Frank Gore – 24 carries, 88 yards

**Top receivers**

- ARI – Early Doucet – 6 receptions, 50 yards
- SF – Michael Crabtree – 7 receptions, 120 yards

**Top tacklers**

- ARI – Paris Lenon – 9 tackles
- SF – Patrick Willis – 6 tackles, 1 assist

With this win, the 49ers improve their record to 9–1, securing them their first winning season since 2002.

==== Week 12: at Baltimore Ravens ====
Thanksgiving Day Game

Week Twelve: San Francisco 49ers at Baltimore Ravens – Game summary

Quarter	1	2	3	4	Total
49ers	3	0	3	0	**6**
**Ravens**	3	3	0	10	**16**

at M&T Bank Stadium, Baltimore, Maryland

- Date: November 24
- Game time: 8:20 pm. EST/5:20 pm. PST
- Game weather: 53 °F (12 °C) (Clear)
- Game attendance: 71,345
- Referee: John Parry
- TV announcers (NFLN): Brad Nessler, Mike Mayock and Alex Flanagan

Game information

**First quarter**

- BAL – Billy Cundiff 39-yard field goal, Ravens 3–0, **Drive: 10 plays, 55 yards, 4:39.**
- SF – David Akers 45-yard field goal, Tied 3–3, **Drive: 9 plays, 41 yards, 4:42.**

**Second quarter**

- BAL – Billy Cundiff 23-yard field goal, Ravens 6–3, **Drive: 6 plays, 60 yards, 3:24.**

**Third quarter**

- SF – David Akers 52-yard field goal, Tied 6–6, **Drive: 13 plays, 46 yards, 7:30.**

**Fourth quarter**

- BAL – Dennis Pitta 8-yard pass from Joe Flacco (Billy Cundiff kick), Ravens 13–6, **Drive: 16 plays, 76 yards, 7:34.**
- BAL – Billy Cundiff 39-yard field goal, Ravens 16–6, **Drive: 8 plays, 39 yards, 4:16.**

**Top passers**

- SF – Alex Smith – 15/24, 140 yards, 1 interception
- BAL – Joe Flacco – 15/23, 161 yards, 1 touchdown

**Top rushers**

- SF – Frank Gore – 14 carries, 39 yards
- BAL – Ray Rice – 21 carries, 59 yards

**Top receivers**

- SF – Michael Crabtree – 6 receptions, 54 yards
- BAL – Anquan Boldin – 4 receptions, 63 yards

**Top tacklers**

- SF – NaVorro Bowman – 9 tackles
- BAL – Bernard Pollard – 8 tackles

Coming off their divisional home win over the Cardinals, head coach Jim Harbaugh and the 49ers flew to M&T Bank Stadium for a Week 12 interconference duel with the Baltimore Ravens and their head coach (Jim's brother) John Harbaugh on Thanksgiving.

San Francisco trailed early in the first quarter as Ravens kicker Billy Cundiff got a 39-yard field goal, yet the 49ers answered with a 45-yard field goal from kicker David Akers. Baltimore struck back in the second quarter with Cundiff making a 23-yard field goal.

San Francisco began the third quarter with a 52-yard field goal from Akers, but the Ravens opened the fourth quarter with quarterback Joe Flacco completing an 8-yard touchdown pass to tight end Dennis Pitta, followed by Cundiff nailing a 39-yard field goal. The Niners tried to rally, but Baltimore's defense held on to preserve the win.

With the loss, the 49ers fell to 9–2.

These two teams would meet again a year later in Super Bowl XLVII with the 49ers falling short, 34–31.

==== Week 13: vs. St. Louis Rams ====
Week Thirteen: St. Louis Rams at San Francisco 49ers – Game summary

Quarter	1	2	3	4	Total
Rams	0	0	0	0	**0**
**49ers**	3	6	10	7	**26**

at Candlestick Park, San Francisco, California

- Date: December 4
- Game time: 1:15 pm. PST
- Game weather: 55 °F (13 °C) (Sunny)
- Game attendance: 69,732
- Referee: Pete Morelli
- TV announcers (Fox): Chris Myers and Tim Ryan

Game information

**First quarter**

- SF – David Akers 36-yard field goal, 49ers 3–0.

**Second quarter**

- SF – David Akers 19-yard field goal, 49ers 6–0.
- SF – David Akers 28-yard field goal, 49ers 9–0.

**Third quarter**

- SF – Michael Crabtree 52-yard pass from Alex Smith (David Akers kick), 49ers 16–0.
- SF – David Akers 34-yard field goal, 49ers 19–0.

**Fourth quarter**

- SF – Kyle Williams 56-yard pass from Alex Smith (David Akers kick), 49ers 26–0.

**Top passers**

- STL – A.J. Feeley – 12/22, 156 yards, 1 interception
- SF – Alex Smith – 17/23, 274 yards, 2 touchdown

**Top rushers**

- STL – Steven Jackson – 10 carries, 19 yards
- SF – Frank Gore – 21 carries, 73 yards

**Top receivers**

- STL – Brandon Gibson – 4 catches, 42 yards
- SF – Michael Crabtree – 4 catches, 96 yards, 1 touchdown

**Top tacklers**

- STL – Craig Dehl – 11 tackles, 2 assists
- SF – NaVarro Bowman – 6 tackles

With the shutout win, not only did the 49ers improve to 10–2, but they also clinched 1st place in the NFC West for their first playoff berth since the 2002 season.

==== Week 14: at Arizona Cardinals ====
Week Fourteen: San Francisco 49ers at Arizona Cardinals – Game summary

Quarter	1	2	3	4	Total
49ers	3	9	7	0	**19**
**Cardinals**	0	7	7	7	**21**

at University of Phoenix Stadium, Glendale, Arizona

- Date: December 11
- Game time: 2:05 p.m. MST/1:05 pm. PST
- Game weather: Played indoors (retractable roof closed)
- Game attendance: 60,808
- Referee: Alberto Riveron
- TV announcers (Fox): Dick Stockton, John Lynch and Jennifer Hale

Game information

**First quarter**

- SF – David Akers 46-yard field goal, 49ers 3–0.

**Second quarter**

- SF – David Akers 22-yard field goal, 49ers 6–0.
- ARI – Early Doucet 60-yard pass from John Skelton (Jay Feely kick), Cardinals 7–6.
- SF – David Akers 27-yard field goal, 49ers 9–7.
- SF – David Akers 22-yard field goal, 49ers 12–7.

**Third quarter**

- SF – Frank Gore 37-yard run (David Akers kick), 49ers 19–7.
- ARI – Larry Fitzgerald 46-yard pass from John Skelton (Jay Feely kick), 49ers 19–14.

**Fourth quarter**

- ARI – Andre Roberts 3-yard pass from John Skelton (Jay Feely kick), Cardinals 21–19.

**Top passers**

- SF – Alex Smith – 18/37, 175 yards
- ARI – John Skelton – 19/28, 282 yards, 3 touchdowns, 2 interceptions

**Top rushers**

- SF – Frank Gore – 10 carries, 72 yards
- ARI – Chris Wells – 15 carries, 27 yards

**Top receivers**

- SF – Michael Crabtree – 7 catches, 63 yards
- ARI – Larry Fitzgerald – 7 catches, 149 yards, 1 touchdown

**Top tacklers**

- SF – Larry Grant – 10 tackles, 1 assist
- ARI – Richard Marshall – 4 tackles, 3 assists

With the loss, the 49ers fell to 10–3.

==== Week 15: vs. Pittsburgh Steelers ====
Week Fifteen: Pittsburgh Steelers at San Francisco 49ers – Game summary

Quarter	1	2	3	4	Total
Steelers	0	0	3	0	**3**
**49ers**	6	0	7	7	**20**

at Candlestick Park, San Francisco, California

- Date: December 19
- Game time: 5:30 pm. PST
- Game weather: 50 °F (10 °C) (Clear)
- Game attendance: 69,732
- Referee: Walt Coleman
- TV announcers (ESPN): Mike Tirico, Ron Jaworski, Jon Gruden and John Sutcliffe

Game information

**First quarter**

- SF – David Akers 22-yard field goal, 49ers 3–0.

**Second quarter**

- SF – David Akers 38-yard field goal, 49ers 6–0.

**Third quarter**

- PIT – Shaun Suisham 51-yard field goal, 49ers 6–3.
- SF – Vernon Davis 1-yard pass from Alex Smith (David Akers kick), 49ers 13–3.

**Fourth quarter**

- SF – Frank Gore 5-yard run (David Akers kick), 49ers 20–3.

**Top passers**

- PIT – Ben Roethlisberger – 25/44, 330 yards, 3 interceptions
- SF – Alex Smith – 18/31, 187 yards, 1 touchdown

**Top rushers**

- PIT – Rashard Mendenhall – 15 carries, 64 yards
- SF – Frank Gore – 18 carries, 65 yards, 1 touchdown

**Top receivers**

- PIT – Jerricho Cotchery – 5 carries, 93 yards
- SF – Vernon Davis – 6 catches, 72 yards, 1 touchdown

**Top tacklers**

- PIT – Troy Polamalu – 7 tackles
- SF – NaVarro Bowman – 7 tackles, 1 assist

The 49ers traveled home for a game on Monday Night Football against the Steelers. It was delayed due to a power outage in their stadium. The lights went off again in the 2nd quarter when the 49ers were leading 6–0, which eventually became the score at halftime. In the 2nd half the 49ers would go on a 14 to 3 run to make the final score 20–3 and improve their record to 11–3.

==== Week 16: at Seattle Seahawks ====
Week Sixteen: San Francisco 49ers at Seattle Seahawks – Game summary

Quarter	1	2	3	4	Total
**49ers**	0	3	10	6	**19**
Seahawks	7	3	0	7	**17**

at CenturyLink Field, Seattle, Washington

- Date: December 24
- Game time: 1:15 pm. PST
- Game weather: 48 °F (9 °C) (Cloudy)
- Game attendance: 66,697
- Referee: Ron Winter
- TV announcers (Fox): Ron Pitts, Charles Davis and Drea Avent

Game information

**First quarter**

- SEA – Doug Baldwin 13-yard pass from Tarvaris Jackson (Steven Hauschka kick), Seahawks 7–0.

**Second quarter**

- SF – David Akers 53-yard field goal, Seahawks 7–3.
- SEA – Steven Hauschka 19-yard field goal, Seahawks 10–3.

**Third quarter**

- SF – Frank Gore 4-yard run (David Akers kick), Tied 10–10.
- SF – David Akers 29-yard field goal, 49ers 13–10.

**Fourth quarter**

- SF – David Akers 44-yard field goal, 49ers 16–10.
- SEA – Marshawn Lynch 4-yard run (Steven Hauschka kick), Seahawks 17–16.
- SF – David Akers 39-yard field goal, 49ers 19–17.

**Top passers**

- SF – Alex Smith – 14/26, 179 yards
- SEA – Tarvaris Jackson – 15/28, 163 yards, 1 touchdown

**Top rushers**

- SF – Frank Gore – 23 carries, 83 yards, 1 touchdown
- SEA – Marshawn Lynch – 21 carries, 107 yards, 1 touchdown

**Top receivers**

- SF – Michael Crabtree – 5 carries, 85 yards
- SEA – Golden Tate – 3 catches, 16 yards

**Top tacklers**

- SF – NaVarro Bowman – 7 tackles, 5 assists
- SEA – Kam Chancellor – 10 tackles

With the win, the 49ers improved to 12–3 and swept the Seahawks for the first time since 2006. The 49ers would not win at CenturyLink Field again until 2019.

==== Week 17: at St. Louis Rams ====
Week Seventeen: San Francisco 49ers at St. Louis Rams – Game summary

Quarter	1	2	3	4	Total
**49ers**	7	13	7	7	**34**
Rams	7	0	3	17	**27**

at Edward Jones Dome, St. Louis, Missouri

- Date: January 1
- Game time: 12:00 p.m. CST/10:00 am. PST
- Game weather: Played indoors (dome stadium)
- Game attendance: 55,990
- Referee: Jeff Triplette
- TV announcers (Fox): Chris Myers, Tim Ryan, & Jaime Maggio

Game information

**First quarter**

**Second quarter**

**Third quarter**

**Fourth quarter**

**Top passers**

- SF –
- STL –

**Top rushers**

- SF –
- STL –

**Top receivers**

- SF –
- STL –

**Top tacklers**

- SF –
- STL –

With the win, the 49ers finished their season at 13–3 as they swept the Rams for the first time since 2009 and captured the NFC's #2 playoff seed.

=== Standings ===
NFC West
	W	L	T	PCT	DIV	CONF	PF	PA	STK
^{(2)} San Francisco 49ers	13	3	0	.813	5–1	10–2	380	229	W3
Arizona Cardinals	8	8	0	.500	4–2	7–5	312	348	W1
Seattle Seahawks	7	9	0	.438	3–3	6–6	321	315	L2
St. Louis Rams	2	14	0	.125	0–6	1–11	193	407	L7

== Postseason ==
=== Schedule ===
Week	Date	Opponent	Result	Record	Venue	Recap
Wild Card	First-round bye					
Divisional	January 14, 2012	New Orleans Saints (3)	W 36–32	1–0	Candlestick Park	Recap
NFC Championship	January 22, 2012	New York Giants (4)	L 17–20	1–1	Candlestick Park	Recap

=== Game summaries ===
==== NFC Divisional Playoffs: vs. #3 New Orleans Saints ====
NFC Divisional Round Playoff Game: New Orleans Saints at San Francisco 49ers – Game summary

Quarter	1	2	3	4	Total
Saints	0	14	0	18	32
49ers	14	3	3	16	36

at Candlestick Park, San Francisco, California

- Date: January 14, 2012
- Game time: 1:30 p.m. PST
- Game weather: 62 °F (17 °C), sunny
- Game attendance: 69,732
- Referee: John Parry
- TV announcers (Fox): Kenny Albert, Daryl Johnston, & Tony Siragusa

Game information

First quarter

- SF – Vernon Davis 49-yard pass from Alex Smith (David Akers kick), 49ers 7–0, Drive: 2 plays, 54 yards, 0:46.
- SF – Michael Crabtree 4-yard catch from Alex Smith (David Akers kick), 49ers 14–0, Drive: 3 plays, 4 yards, 0:15.

Second quarter

- SF – David Akers 21-yard field goal, 49ers 17–0, Drive: 4 plays, 6 yards, 1:23.
- NO – Jimmy Graham 14-yard pass from Drew Brees (John Kasay kick), 49ers 17–7, Drive: 9 plays, 80 yards, 4:40.
- NO – Marques Colston 25-yard pass from Drew Brees (John Kasay kick), 49ers 17–14, Drive: 7 plays, 66 yards, 3:04.

Third quarter

- SF – David Akers 41-yard field goal, 49ers 20–14, Drive: 4 plays, 3 yards, 0:59.

Fourth quarter

- NO – John Kasay 48-yard field goal, 49ers 20–17, Drive: 9 plays, 37 yards, 0:59.
- SF – David Akers 37-yard field goal, 49ers 23–17, Drive: 5 plays, 45 yards, 3:02
- NO – Darren Sproles 44-yard pass from Drew Brees (John Kasay kick), Saints 24–23, Drive: 9 plays, 79 yards, 3:34.
- SF – Alex Smith 28-yard run (2-point conversion failed), 49ers 29–24, Drive: 6 plays, 80 yards, 1:51.
- NO – Jimmy Graham 66-yard pass from Drew Brees (Drew Brees pass to Darren Sproles for two-point conversion), Saints 32–29, Drive: 4 plays, 88 yards, 0:34.
- SF – Vernon Davis 14-yard pass from Alex Smith (David Akers kick), 49ers 36–32, Drive: 7 plays, 85 yards, 1:28.

Top passers

- NO – Drew Brees – 40/63, 462 yards, 4 touchdowns, 2 interceptions
- SF – Alex Smith – 24/42, 299 yards, 3 touchdowns, 0 interceptions

Top rushers

- NO – Chris Ivory – 9 carries, 23 yards, 0 touchdowns
- SF – Frank Gore – 13 carries, 89 yards, 0 touchdowns

Top receivers

- NO – Marques Colston – 9 receptions, 136 yards, 1 touchdown
- SF – Vernon Davis – 7 receptions, 180 yards, 2 touchdowns

Top tacklers

- NO – Malcolm Jenkins – 8 tackles, 0 assists, 1 sack
- SF – Dashon Goldson – 11 tackles, 0 assists, 1 interception

Alex Smith's 14-yard touchdown pass to tight end Vernon Davis with 9 seconds left gave San Francisco their first playoff win since 2002 at the end of a wild, back and forth final quarter which featured four lead changes in a span of 3:53. Sports writers and 49ers fans have taken to referring Davis' catch as The Catch III, as it occurred four days after the 30th anniversary of The Catch – Joe Montana's famous game-winning touchdown pass to Dwight Clark in the 1981 NFC Championship game against the Dallas Cowboys, one of the most famous plays in San Francisco 49ers history as it helped propel the 49ers to their first-ever Super Bowl, with both plays occurring with the 49ers trailing with less than a minute to play and facing 3rd down and 3 yards to go. This game was voted the number 1 game of 2011 by NFL.com. (The Catch II refers to Steve Young's game-winning pass to Terrell Owens in the 1998 NFC Wild Card Game against the Green Bay Packers.) With the win, the 49ers improved to 14–3 and faced the New York Giants at Candlestick Park in the NFC Championship Game. 49ers face off the New York Giants but lost in the NFC Championship Game 20-17.

==== NFC Championship: vs. #4 New York Giants ====
NFC Championship: New York Giants at San Francisco 49ers – Game summary

Quarter	1	2	3	4	OT	Total
Giants	0	10	0	7	3	20
49ers	7	0	7	3	0	17

at Candlestick Park, San Francisco, California

- Date: January 22, 2012
- Game time: 3:30 pm. PST
- Game weather: 52 °F (11 °C), rain
- Game attendance: 69,732
- Referee: Ed Hochuli
- TV announcers (Fox): Joe Buck, Troy Aikman, Pam Oliver and Chris Myers

Game information

First quarter

- SF – Vernon Davis 73-yard pass from Alex Smith (David Akers kick), 7:21. 49ers 7–0. Drive: 2 plays, 73 yards, 0:13

Second quarter

- NYG – Bear Pascoe 6-yard pass from Eli Manning (Lawrence Tynes kick). Giants 7–7. Drive: 10 plays, 69 yards, 4:16
- NYG – Lawrence Tynes 31-yard field goal, 0:02. Giants 10–7. Drive: 10 plays, 51 yards, 1:34

Third quarter

- SF – Vernon Davis 28-yard pass from Alex Smith (David Akers kick), 5:18. 49ers 14–10. Drive: 3 plays, 54 yards, 1:30

Fourth quarter

- NYG – Mario Manningham 17-yard pass from Eli Manning (Lawrence Tynes kick), 8:34. Giants 17–14. Drive: 6 plays, 29 yards, 2:34
- SF – David Akers 25-yard field goal, 5:39. Giants 17–17. Drive: 6 plays, 48 yards, 2:55

Overtime

- NYG – Lawrence Tynes 31-yard field goal, 7:06. Giants 20–17. Drive: 5 plays, 11 yards, 2:26

Top passers

- NYG – Eli Manning – 32/58, 316 yards, 2 touchdowns, 0 interceptions
- SF – A. Smith – 12/26, 196 yards, 2 touchdowns, 0 interceptions

Top rushers

- NYG – Ahmad Bradshaw – 20 Carries, 74 yards, 0 touchdowns
- SF – Frank Gore – 16 Carries, 74 yards, 0 touchdowns

Top receivers

- NYG – Victor Cruz – 10 Rec, 142 yards, 0 touchdowns
- SF – Vernon Davis – 3 Rec, 112 yards, 2 touchdowns

Top tacklers

- NYG – Chase Blackburn – 7 Tot, 5 Solo
- SF – NaVorro Bowman – 13 Tot, 7 Solo

For the fifth time in conference championship history and for the third time in five years, overtime decided the game, and as it was in the 2007 NFC Championship Game, a field goal by Lawrence Tynes was the winning score as the Giants defeated the 49ers for their fifth NFC Championship Game victory. The Giants became the third team in NFL history to advance to the Super Bowl with fewer than 10 wins during the regular season, joining the 1979 Los Angeles Rams and the 2008 Arizona Cardinals.

With Ted Ginn Jr. injured, Rookie Kyle Williams started at wide receiver and performed punt returns in the NFC Championship Game. He lost two fumbles returning punts, including one in overtime that preceded the game-winning field goal by the Giants. His other fumble in the fourth quarter was followed by a Giants' touchdown to retake the lead, 17–14. QB Alex Smith defended Williams, saying: "Offensively we weren't good enough today. We didn't get it done .... You can't put it on [Williams]". The 49ers did not make a 3rd down conversion until the 4th quarter. The 49ers' season ended with a 14–4 record.

== Team statistics ==
- Set franchise and NFL record for fewest turnovers in a season (10)
- Fewest rushing touchdowns allowed in the NFL since 1978 (3)
- Most consecutive games not allowing a rushing touchdown since 1970 (15)
- Highest turnover differential in franchise history (+28)
- Set franchise record of not allowing a 100-yard rusher in 36 consecutive games (dating back to 2009)
- NFL record set for most field goals made and attempted in a single season (David Akers, 44 out of 52)
