= Colin Jones (American football) =

American football player (born 1987)

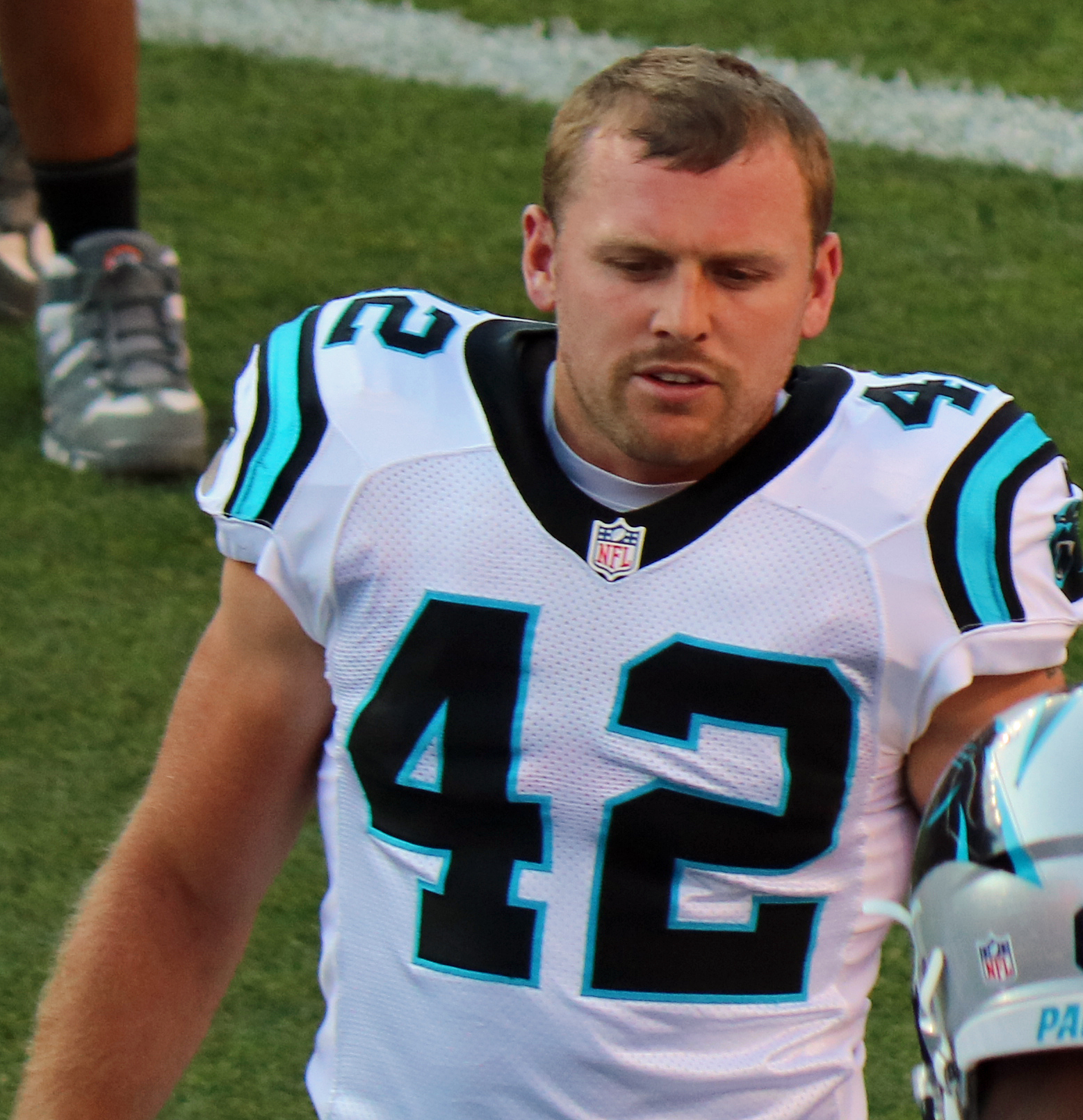
- Jones with the Carolina Panthers in 2016

No. 42, 43
- Position: Safety

Personal information
- Born: October 27, 1987 (age 39); Bridgeport, Texas, U.S.
- Listed height: 6 ft 0 in (1.83 m)
- Listed weight: 205 lb (93 kg)

Career information
- High school: Bridgeport
- College: TCU
- NFL draft: 2011: 6th round, 190th overall pick

Career history
- San Francisco 49ers (2011); Carolina Panthers (2012–2019)

Awards and highlights
- Second-team All-MWC (2010)

Career NFL statistics
- Total tackles: 133
- Sacks: 1.0
- Forced fumbles: 1
- Fumble recoveries: 3
- Interceptions: 3
- Total touchdowns: 1
- Stats at Pro Football Reference

Colin Jones (born October 27, 1987) is an American former professional football player who was a safety in the National Football League (NFL). He was selected by the San Francisco 49ers in the sixth round of the 2011 NFL draft. He played college football for the TCU Horned Frogs. He also played for the Carolina Panthers.

== Early life ==
Jones went to high school in Bridgeport, Texas and graduated in 2006.

== Professional career ==
Pre-draft measurables
Height	Weight	40-yard dash	10-yard split	20-yard split	20-yard shuttle	Three-cone drill	Vertical jump	Broad jump	Bench press
5 ft 11 1/2 in (1.82 m)	201 lb (91 kg)	4.38 s	1.44 s	2.56 s	4.04 s	6.69 s	37.0 in (0.94 m)	10 ft 4 in (3.15 m)	20 reps
All values from TCU's Pro Day

=== San Francisco 49ers ===
The San Francisco 49ers selected Jones in the sixth round (190th overall) of the 2011 NFL draft. Jones was the 13th safety drafted in 2011. On July 29, 2011, the San Francisco 49ers signed Jones to a four-year, $2.13 million contract that includes a signing bonus of $100,000.

Throughout training camp, Jones competed for a roster spot as a backup safety and special teams player against Madieu Williams, Curtis Taylor, Chris Maragos, and Anthony West. Head coach Jim Harbaugh named Jones the third free safety on the depth chart to begin the regular season, behind Dashon Goldson and Madieu Williams.

Jones made his professional regular season debut in the San Francisco 49ers' season-opening 33–17 victory against the Seattle Seahawks. Jones was inactive as a healthy scratch for three games (Weeks 2–4). On December 4, 2011, Jones recorded a season-high two solo tackles in the 49ers' 26–0 win against the St. Louis Rams in Week 13. He finished his rookie season in 2011 with six solo tackles in 13 games and zero starts. The San Francisco 49ers finished first in the NFC West with a 13–3 record and earned a first round bye. On January 14, 2012, Jones appeared in his first career playoff game and recorded two solo tackles during their 36–32 win against the New Orleans Saints in the NFC Wild Card Game. The following week, he made one solo tackle as the 49ers lost 20–17 to the New York Giants in the NFC Championship Game.

During training camp in 2012, Jones competed for a role as a backup safety against Trenton Robinson, Michael Thomas, Darcel McBath, Mark LeGree, and Ben Hannula.

=== Carolina Panthers ===
On August 31, 2012, the 49ers traded Jones to the Carolina Panthers for a seventh round pick (243rd overall) in the 2014 NFL draft. Head coach Ron Rivera named Jones the third free safety on the depth chart to begin the regular season, behind Haruki Nakamura and Sherrod Martin.

Jones was inactive during the Panthers' Week 3 loss to the New York Giants due to an injury. In Week 8, Jones collected a season-high two solo tackles during a 23-22 loss at the Chicago Bears. Jones finished the season with 14 combined tackles (ten solo) in 15 games and zero starts. His first two years with the team his role was exclusively special teams, but he started playing nickel corner and backup free safety in 2014.

On June 18, 2014, Jones signed a two-year contract extension with the Panthers.

In 2015, Jones recorded his first career interception in the Week 7 win against the Philadelphia Eagles quarterback Sam Bradford.

On February 7, 2016, Jones was part of the Panthers team that played in Super Bowl 50. In the game, the Panthers fell to the Denver Broncos by a score of 24–10.

On March 7, 2017, Jones signed a two-year contract extension with the Panthers.

On March 11, 2019, Jones signed a two-year contract extension with the Panthers. The Panthers released Jones on March 16, 2020.

== NFL career statistics ==
Legend
**Bold**	Career high

=== Regular season ===
Year	Team	Games		Tackles					Interceptions					Fumbles			
Year	Team	GP	GS	Cmb	Solo	Ast	Sck	TFL	Int	Yds	TD	Lng	PD	FF	FR	Yds	TD
2011	SFO	13	0	6	6	0	0.0	0	0	0	0	0	0	0	**1**	0	0
2012	CAR	15	0	14	10	4	0.0	0	0	0	0	0	0	0	0	0	0
2013	CAR	**16**	0	7	6	1	0.0	0	0	0	0	0	0	0	**1**	0	0
2014	CAR	**16**	2	**27**	**21**	6	**1.0**	**4**	0	0	0	0	**3**	**1**	0	0	0
2015	CAR	15	3	21	16	5	0.0	1	**1**	0	0	0	1	0	0	0	0
2016	CAR	14	1	6	5	1	0.0	0	0	0	0	0	0	0	0	0	0
2017	CAR	**16**	**7**	23	14	9	0.0	0	**1**	**10**	0	**10**	2	0	0	0	0
2018	CAR	**16**	1	20	8	**12**	0.0	0	**1**	5	0	5	1	0	**1**	0	**1**
2019	CAR	**16**	0	9	7	2	0.0	0	0	0	0	0	0	0	0	0	0
		137	14	133	93	40	1.0	5	3	15	0	10	7	1	3	0	1

=== Playoffs ===
Year	Team	Games		Tackles					Interceptions					Fumbles			
Year	Team	GP	GS	Cmb	Solo	Ast	Sck	TFL	Int	Yds	TD	Lng	PD	FF	FR	Yds	TD
2011	SFO	2	0	3	3	0	0.0	0	0	0	0	0	0	0	**1**	**1**	0
2013	CAR	1	0	0	0	0	0.0	0	0	0	0	0	0	0	0	0	0
2014	CAR	2	**1**	**8**	**4**	**4**	0.0	**2**	0	0	0	0	**1**	0	0	0	0
2015	CAR	**3**	0	0	0	0	0.0	0	0	0	0	0	0	0	0	0	0
2017	CAR	1	0	0	0	0	0.0	0	0	0	0	0	0	0	0	0	0
		9	1	11	7	4	0.0	2	0	0	0	0	1	0	1	1	0

== Personal life ==
Jones married Briana Lewis on February 18, 2012. They have one son.

Jones is a practicing Christian and a member of the Board of Directors of the Christian Outdoor Alliance. He attends Myers Park Methodist Church in Charlotte, North Carolina.
