= Dashon Goldson =

American football player (born 1984)

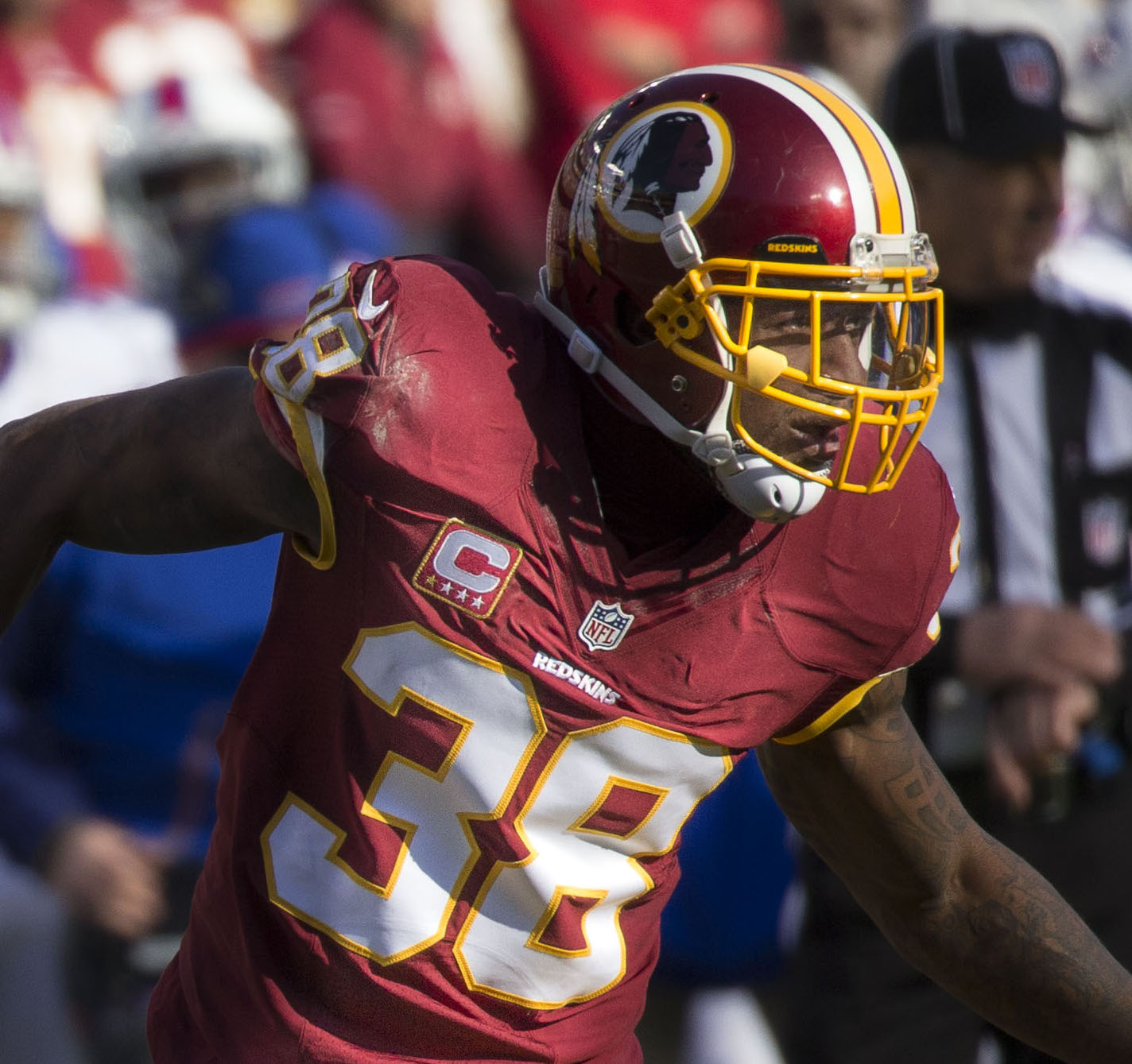
- Goldson with the Washington Redskins in 2015

Personal information
- Born: September 18, 1984 (age 42); Carson, California, U.S.
- Listed height: 6 ft 2 in (1.88 m)
- Listed weight: 205 lb (93 kg)

Career information
- Position: Safety (No. 38)
- High school: Narbonne (Harbor City, California)
- College: Coffeyville (2002); Washington (2003–2006)
- NFL draft: 2007: 4th round, 126th overall pick

Career history

Playing
- San Francisco 49ers (2007–2012); Tampa Bay Buccaneers (2013–2014); Washington Redskins (2015); Atlanta Falcons (2016)

Coaching
- San Francisco 49ers (2023) Bill Walsh coaching fellow; Los Angeles Chargers (2024) Coaching intern

Awards and highlights
- First-team All-Pro (2012); 2× Pro Bowl (2011, 2012)

Career NFL statistics
- Total tackles: 607
- Sacks: 3.0
- Forced fumbles: 8
- Fumble recoveries: 8
- Interceptions: 16
- Defensive touchdowns: 2
- Stats at Pro Football Reference

Dashon Hugh Goldson (born September 18, 1984) is an American former professional football player who was a safety in the National Football League (NFL). He played college football for the Washington Huskies, and was selected by the San Francisco 49ers in the fourth round of the 2007 NFL draft. He also played for the Tampa Bay Buccaneers, Washington Redskins, and Atlanta Falcons.

== Early life ==
Goldson was born in Carson, California. He started playing football with the Tri-City Falcons which is a Pop Warner team in Harbor City, California. He played high school football at Narbonne High School in Harbor City, CA where as a senior he totaled 130 tackles and six interceptions, with two returned for touchdowns.

== College career ==
Goldson had a short stint at Coffeyville community college before enrolling at the University of Washington, where he played for the Washington Huskies football team from 2003 to 2006. He played in 43 games and recorded a total of 293 tackles, six interceptions, two forced fumbles and one sack. He graduated from the University of Washington in June 2006 with a degree in American Ethnic Studies.

== Professional playing career ==
Pre-draft measurables
Height	Weight	40-yard dash	10-yard split	20-yard split	20-yard shuttle	Three-cone drill	Vertical jump	Broad jump	Bench press
6 ft 1 1/4 in (1.86 m)	205 lb (93 kg)	4.65 s	1.53 s	2.72 s	4.46 s	7.37 s	34.5 in (0.88 m)	9 ft 7 in (2.92 m)	12 reps
All values from 2007 NFL Combine

=== San Francisco 49ers ===
==== 2009 season ====
Goldson was selected by the San Francisco 49ers in the fourth round (126th overall) in the 2007 NFL draft. In his rookie season, he played in ten games, recording 15 tackles as a backup to then-starting safety Mark Roman. In his second year with the 49ers, Goldson recorded 21 tackles as a backup.

In 2009, the 49ers front office announced that Goldson would be the starter for free safety going into next season, while giving current starter Mark Roman permission to seek a trade. Although at the time this move was highly questioned, Goldson quickly proved doubters wrong.

Goldson made his NFL debut as a starter against the divisional rival Arizona Cardinals on September 13, where the 49ers were victorious on the season opener, winning 20–16 against the reigning NFC conference champions. In Week 2, Goldson recorded his first career interception by diving under a pass that was tipped by Nate Burleson. The 2009 season would prove to be a productive season, where Goldson led all San Francisco defenders in interceptions with four, and he also forced three fumbles. Goldson finished his first year as an NFL starter with 94 tackles, two sacks, six pass defenses and four interceptions. This was the beginning of Goldson's arrival in the league.

==== 2010 season ====
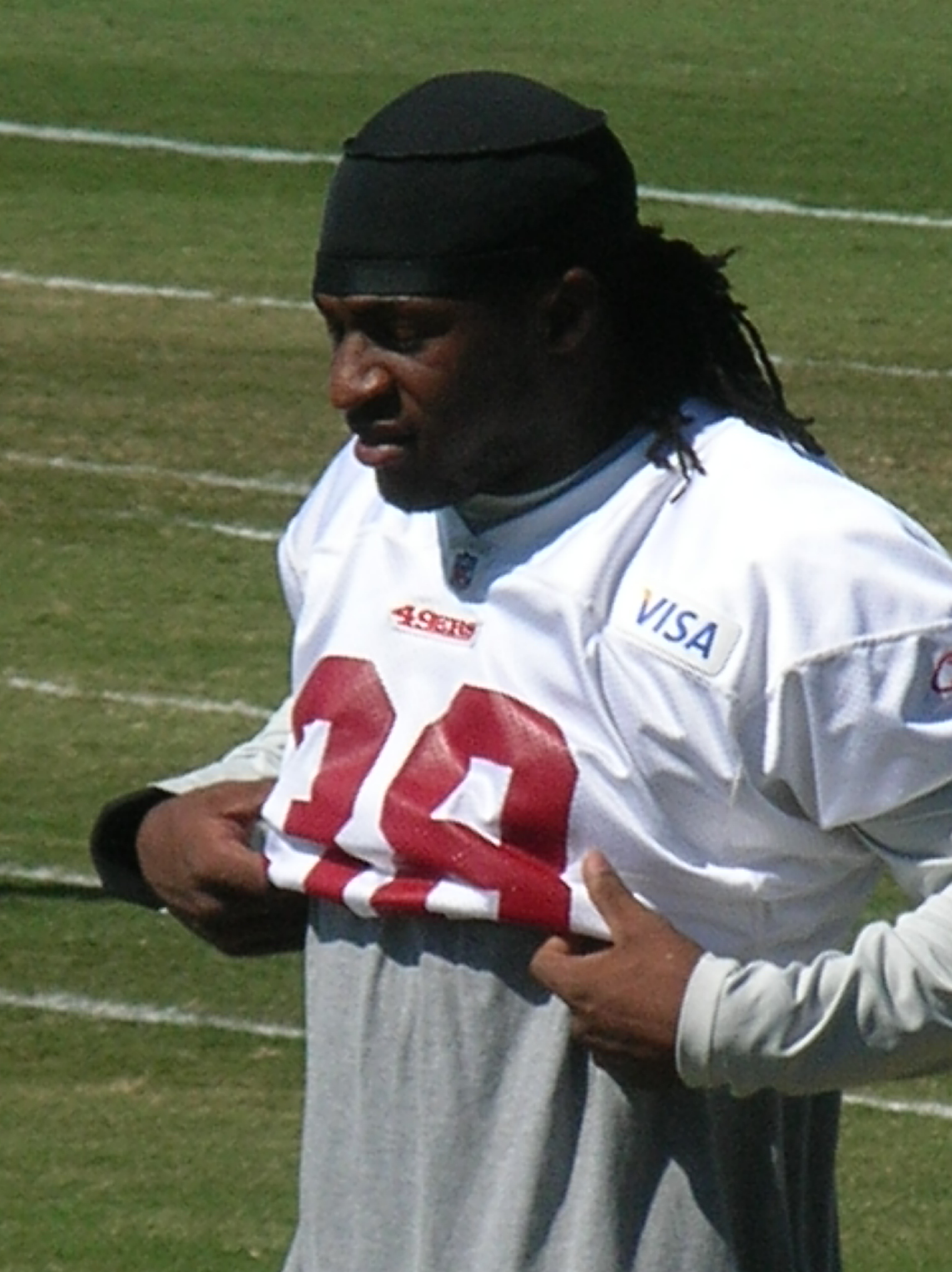
Goldson at 49ers training camp in 2010.

Goldson struggled during much of the 2010 season, missing tackles and not forcing turnovers like he did in 2009, finishing with 59 tackles and one interception. Although the San Francisco 49ers team as a whole struggled this year, they showed strides leading up to the 2011 campaign.

==== 2011 season ====
Prior to the 2011 season, Goldson was an unrestricted free agent and visited with the New England Patriots. He ultimately decided to sign a one-year contract and re-sign with the 49ers. He was named to his first career Pro Bowl, coming in second in the NFC in voting behind Earl Thomas. He had a career-high 6 interceptions and 9 pass deflections during the regular season and is now known to be one of the hardest hitting safeties in the NFL. In the playoffs, he intercepted a Drew Brees pass and returned it near the goal line which resulted in an Alex Smith touchdown pass to Michael Crabtree to give the 49ers a first-quarter 14–0 lead.

==== 2012 season ====
On October 26, 2012, Goldson was fined $7,875 for taunting the Seattle Seahawks in Week 7. On December 20, 2012, he was fined $77,500 for uniform violations and a helmet-to-helmet collision with Patriots tight end Aaron Hernandez.

In the 2012 season, Goldson and the 49ers appeared in Super Bowl XLVII. In the game, he had nine combined tackles as the 49ers fell to the Baltimore Ravens by a score of 31–34.

He was named to the Pro Bowl and was named to the All-Pro team for the first time in his career.

=== Tampa Bay Buccaneers ===
On March 13, 2013, Goldson signed a five-year, $41.25 million contract, including $22 million guaranteed with the Tampa Bay Buccaneers. He joined newly arrived cornerback Darrelle Revis and 43rd overall draft pick Johnthan Banks. On September 16, 2013, Goldson was suspended for one game for his helmet-to-helmet hit on New Orleans Saints running back Darren Sproles the previous day. Upon appeal, however, the suspension was overturned and Goldson's penalty for the hit reduced to a $100,000 fine.

In 2014, Goldson recorded 81 combined tackles, of which 63 were solo.

=== Washington Redskins ===
On April 3, 2015, Goldson was traded to the Washington Redskins, along with a seventh round pick, for a sixth round pick in the 2016 NFL draft. At the start of the 2015 season, he was voted as the team's defensive captain.

Goldson was released on March 7, 2016 after just one season with the team.

=== Atlanta Falcons ===
On August 28, 2016, Goldson was signed by the Atlanta Falcons to fill a backup role due to safety Keanu Neal injuring his knee. In four games, Goldson made one tackle, coming in a 24–26 loss to the Seattle Seahawks in Week 6. On October 19, 2016, he was released by the Falcons. On December 20, 2016, he was re-signed by the Falcons. Goldson was inactive for the Falcons' 28–34 overtime loss to the New England Patriots in the Super Bowl.

=== NFL statistics ===
Year	Team	Games		Tackles				Fumbles			Interceptions					
Year	Team	G	GS	Comb	Total	Ast	Sack	FF	FR	Yds	Int	Yds	Avg	Lng	TD	PD
2007	SF	10	0	15	12	3	0.0	0	0	0	0	0	0.0	0	0	2
2008	SF	9	2	21	18	3	0.0	0	0	0	0	0	0.0	0	0	1
2009	SF	16	16	94	76	18	2.0	3	1	0	4	39	9.8	34	0	6
2010	SF	16	16	80	62	18	1.0	0	0	0	1	39	39.0	39	1	5
2011	SF	14	14	67	55	12	0.0	1	1	0	6	53	8.8	21	0	9
2012	SF	16	16	69	55	14	0.0	1	2	71	3	21	7.0	20	0	11
2013	TB	13	13	72	54	18	0.0	1	1	0	1	0	0.0	0	0	8
2014	TB	14	14	81	63	18	0.0	0	1	2	0	0	0.0	0	0	1
2015	WAS	15	15	110	71	39	0.0	1	2	14	1	35	35.0	35	1	3
2016	ATL	4	0	1	0	1	0.0	0	0	0	0	0	0.0	0	0	0
Career		127	106	610	466	144	3.0	7	8	87	16	187	11.7	39	2	46

== Professional coaching career ==
In July 2023, Goldson was brought onto the coaching staff of San Francisco 49ers as part of Bill Walsh NFL Diversity Coaching Fellowship, where he worked with the team's defensive backs during the 2023 offseason. In the 2024 offseason, Goldson was hired as a coaching intern by the Los Angeles Chargers reuniting with his former head coach. Jim Harbaugh.
