= Cam Johnson (defensive end) =

American football player (born 1990)

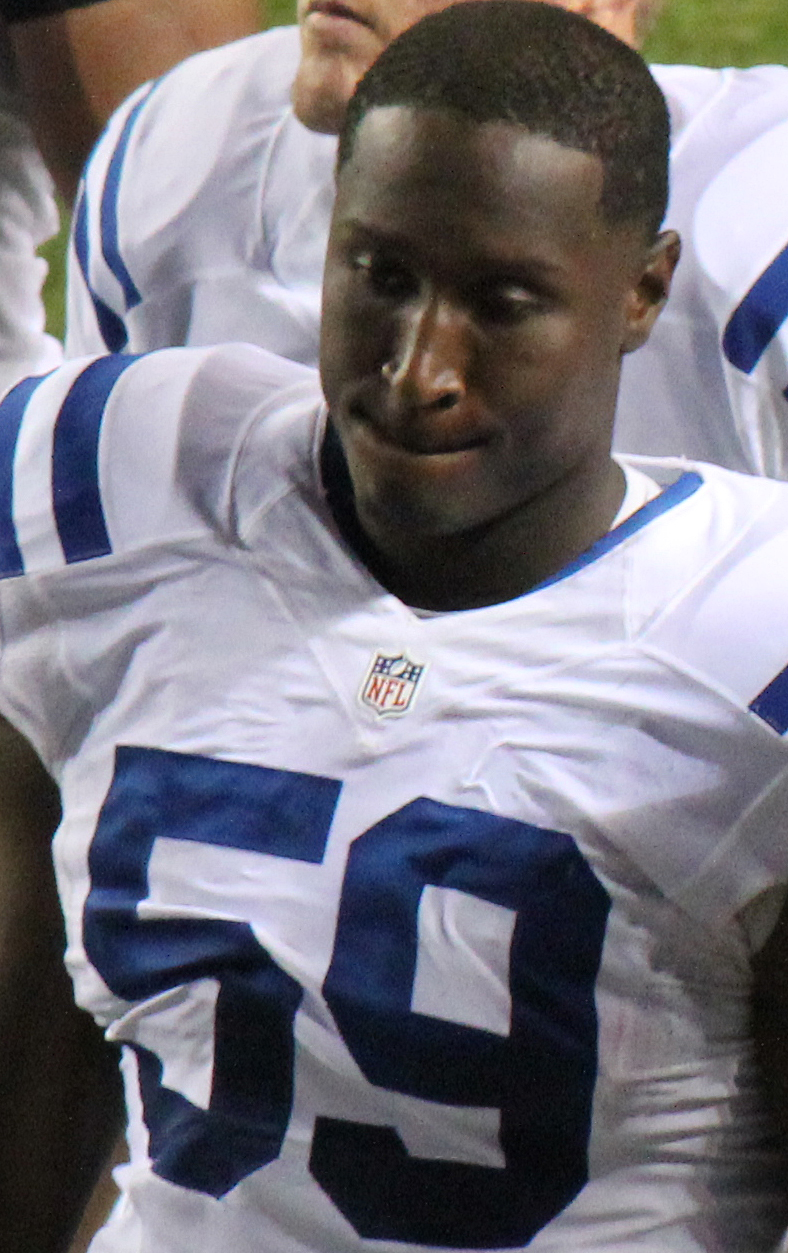
- Johnson with the Indianapolis Colts in 2014

No. 50, 59, 57
- Position: Defensive end

Personal information
- Born: May 24, 1990 (age 36); Washington, D.C., U.S.
- Listed height: 6 ft 4 in (1.93 m)
- Listed weight: 268 lb (122 kg)

Career information
- High school: Gonzaga College (Washington, D.C.)
- College: Virginia
- NFL draft: 2012: 7th round, 237th overall pick

Career history
- San Francisco 49ers (2012); Indianapolis Colts (2013–2014); Cleveland Browns (2015); Arizona Cardinals (2016)*; Cleveland Browns (2016); Detroit Lions (2018)*
- * Offseason or practice squad member only

Career NFL statistics
- Total tackles: 40
- Sacks: 3
- Forced fumbles: 2
- Stats at Pro Football Reference

Cameron Johnson (born May 24, 1990) is an American former professional football player who was a linebacker and defensive end in the National Football League (NFL). He was a two-sport star at Gonzaga College High School (basketball and football) in Washington, D.C. He then played college football for the Virginia Cavaliers, and was selected by the San Francisco 49ers in the seventh round of the 2012 NFL draft.

== Early life ==
Johnson attended Gonzaga High School in Washington, D.C., U.S. He played both wide receiver and defensive back. As a senior, he caught 22 passes for 269 yards and two touchdowns. He was named to the second-team all-conference at wide receiver. He was also a standout basketball player, earning all-conference honors.

Considered only a three-star recruit by Rivals.com, he was rated as the No. 40 safety prospect in the nation. He accepted a scholarship to Virginia over other offers from Georgia, Duke, Miami, Syracuse, Pittsburgh, and Maryland.

== College career ==
As a freshman in 2008, he played in 6 games, mostly as a reserve linebacker and on special teams. He recorded 7 total tackles, including 2 tackles for loss. In 2009, he played in all 12 games for the Cavaliers, starting in 10 of them as an outside linebacker. He recorded 40 tackles including 5 tackles for loss and 2 sacks. In 2010, the Cavaliers defense switched their scheme from a 3–4 to a 4–3, allowing Johnson to move from outside linebacker to defensive end. As a junior in 2010, he started in 12 games, and recorded his best statistical season of his career. He recorded 53 total tackles, including 14.5 for loss and 6.5 sacks, he also recovered two fumbles. In 2011, his final season, his performance dropped off due to several nagging injuries, but still managed to start in all 12 games. He recorded 30 total tackles, including 11 tackles for loss and 4 sacks, he also forced two fumbles, one of which was recovered.

=== College statistics ===
Year	G	GS	Tackles	TFL - Yards	Sacks - Yards
2008	6	0	7	2.0 - 3	0 - 0
2009	12	10	40	5.0 - 45	2 - 25
2010	12	12	53	14.5 - 61	6.5 - 45
2011	12	12	30	11.0 - 36	4.0 - 25
Tot.	42	34	130	32.5 - 145	12.5 - 95

== Professional career ==
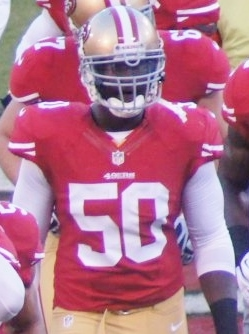
Johnson with the 49ers in 2012

Pre-draft measurables
Height	Weight	Arm length	Hand span	Wingspan	40-yard dash	10-yard split	20-yard split	20-yard shuttle	Three-cone drill	Vertical jump	Broad jump	Bench press
6 ft 3 1/2 in (1.92 m)	268 lb (122 kg)	33 1/2 in (0.85 m)	9 in (0.23 m)	6 ft 7 3/4 in (2.03 m)	4.81 s	1.61 s	2.64 s	4.38 s	7.20 s	35.0 in (0.89 m)	9 ft 7 in (2.92 m)	16 reps
All values from NFL Combine/Pro Day

=== San Francisco 49ers ===
Johnson was selected by the San Francisco 49ers in the seventh round (237th overall) of the 2012 NFL draft.

=== Indianapolis Colts ===
Johnson was acquired by the Indianapolis Colts via trade with the 49ers in exchange for a conditional draft pick on September 2, 2013. On September 5, 2015, Johnson was waived by the Colts.

=== Cleveland Browns ===
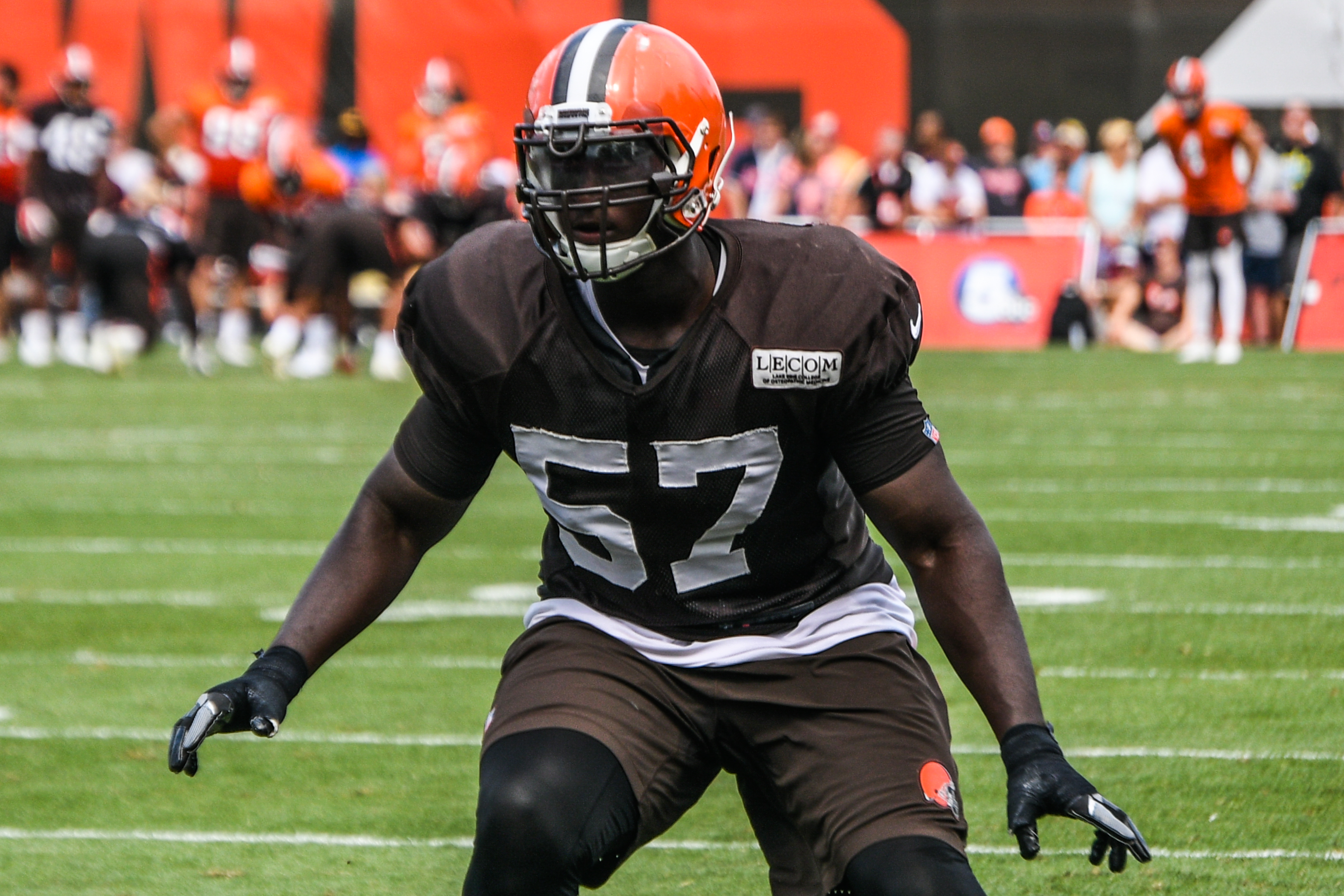
Johnson with the Browns in 2017

On September 22, 2015, Johnson was signed to the Cleveland Browns' practice squad. On September 4, 2016, he was waived by the Browns.

=== Arizona Cardinals ===
On September 27, 2016, Johnson was signed to the Arizona Cardinals' practice squad.

=== Second stint with Browns ===
Johnson was signed by the Browns off the Cardinals' practice squad on October 1, 2016. He was waived on August 29, 2017.

=== Detroit Lions ===
On January 8, 2018, Johnson signed a reserve/future contract with the Detroit Lions. He was released on August 31, 2018.
