= Mike Person =

American football player (born 1988)

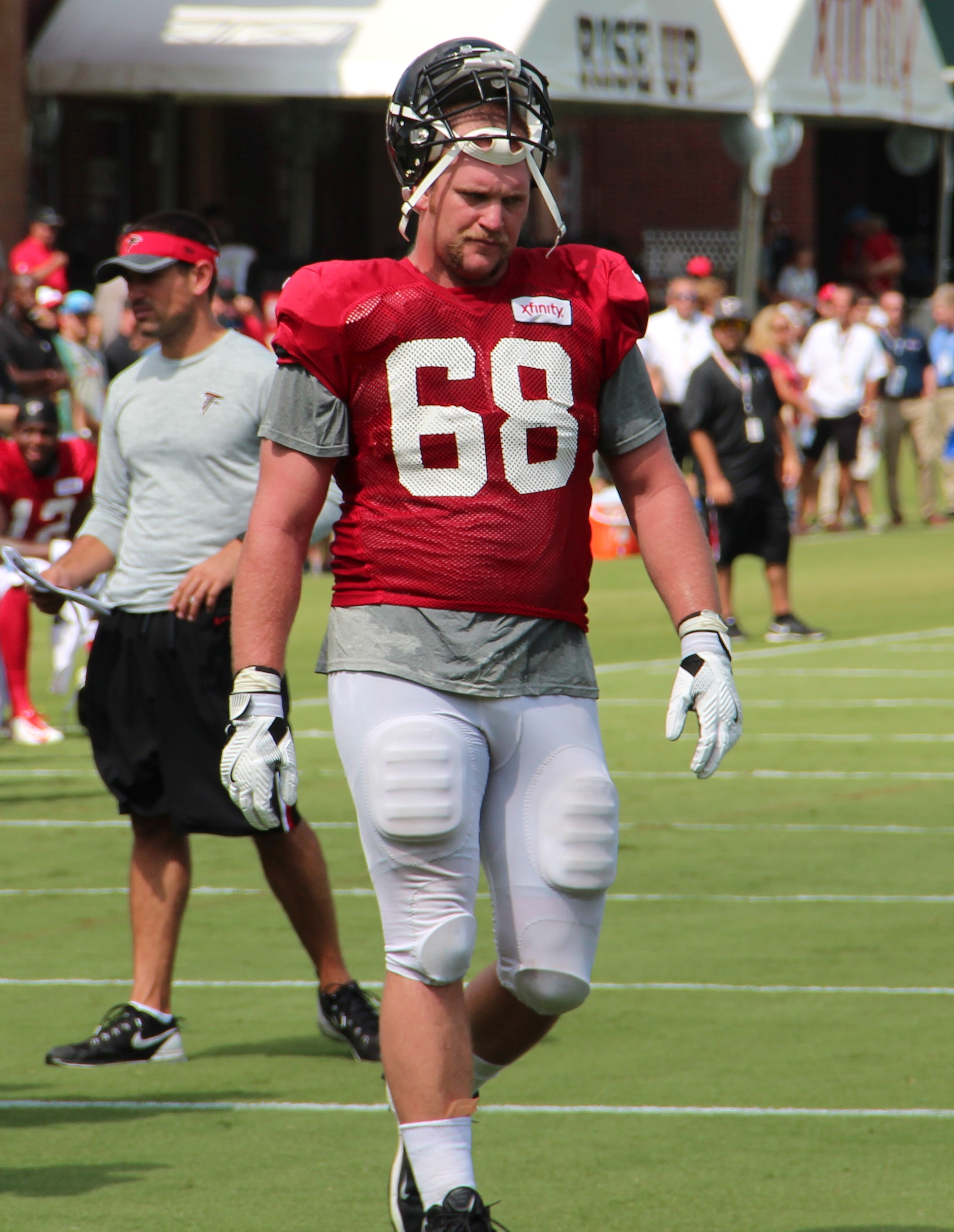
- Person with the Atlanta Falcons in 2016

Miami Dolphins
- Title: Offensive assistant

Personal information
- Born: June 17, 1988 (age 38); Glendive, Montana, U.S.
- Listed height: 6 ft 4 in (1.93 m)
- Listed weight: 305 lb (138 kg)

Career information
- High school: Dawson County (Glendive)
- College: Montana State
- NFL draft: 2011: 7th round, 239th overall pick

Career history

Playing
- San Francisco 49ers (2011); Indianapolis Colts (2012); Seattle Seahawks (2012–2013); St. Louis Rams (2013–2014); Atlanta Falcons (2015–2016); Kansas City Chiefs (2016); Indianapolis Colts (2017); San Francisco 49ers (2018–2019)

Coaching
- Miami Dolphins (2022–present) Offensive assistant

Career NFL statistics
- Games played: 73
- Games started: 48
- Stats at Pro Football Reference

Michael Sean Person (born May 17, 1988) is an American former professional football player who was a guard in the National Football League (NFL). He was selected by the San Francisco 49ers in the seventh round of the 2011 NFL draft. He played college football for the Montana State Bobcats.

Person was also a member of the Indianapolis Colts, Seattle Seahawks, St. Louis Rams, Atlanta Falcons, Kansas City Chiefs.

== Early life ==
Person was two-time offensive lineman of the year in high school. He was named team MVP for Dawson County High School during his senior year.

== College career ==
He was selected as an honorable mention all-conference team in 2010.

== Professional career ==
Pre-draft measurables
Height	Weight	Arm length	Hand span	Wingspan	40-yard dash	10-yard split	20-yard split	20-yard shuttle	Three-cone drill	Vertical jump	Broad jump	Bench press
6 ft 4 1/2 in (1.94 m)	299 lb (136 kg)	32 3/4 in (0.83 m)	9 5/8 in (0.24 m)	6 ft 5 5/8 in (1.97 m)	5.19 s	1.80 s	3.03 s	4.50 s	7.44 s	29.0 in (0.74 m)	9 ft 0 in (2.74 m)	22 reps
All values from NFL Combine/Pro Day

=== San Francisco 49ers (first stint) ===
Person was selected by the San Francisco 49ers in the seventh round of the 2011 NFL draft. He was released by the 49ers on August 31, 2012.

=== Indianapolis Colts (first stint) ===
Person was claimed off waivers by the Indianapolis Colts on September 1, 2012. The Colts waived Person on September 10, 2012.

=== Seattle Seahawks ===
Person was added to the Seattle Seahawks practice squad on September 13, 2012. He was promoted to the active roster on October 30, 2012. Person was released by the Seahawks on September 14, 2013.

=== St. Louis Rams ===
Person was claimed off waivers by the St. Louis Rams on September 17, 2013.

=== Atlanta Falcons ===
Person signed with the Falcons on March 10, 2015. He was released by the Falcons on October 25, 2016.

=== Kansas City Chiefs ===
On November 2, 2016, Person was signed by the Kansas City Chiefs. On March 10, 2017, Person re-signed with the Chiefs. He was released on September 2, 2017.

=== Indianapolis Colts (second stint) ===
On October 3, 2017, Person signed with the Colts. He played in 12 games and started four games at center after Ryan Kelly suffered an injury.

=== San Francisco 49ers (second stint) ===
On May 9, 2018, Person signed with the 49ers. He was named the 49ers starting right guard, starting in all 16 games.

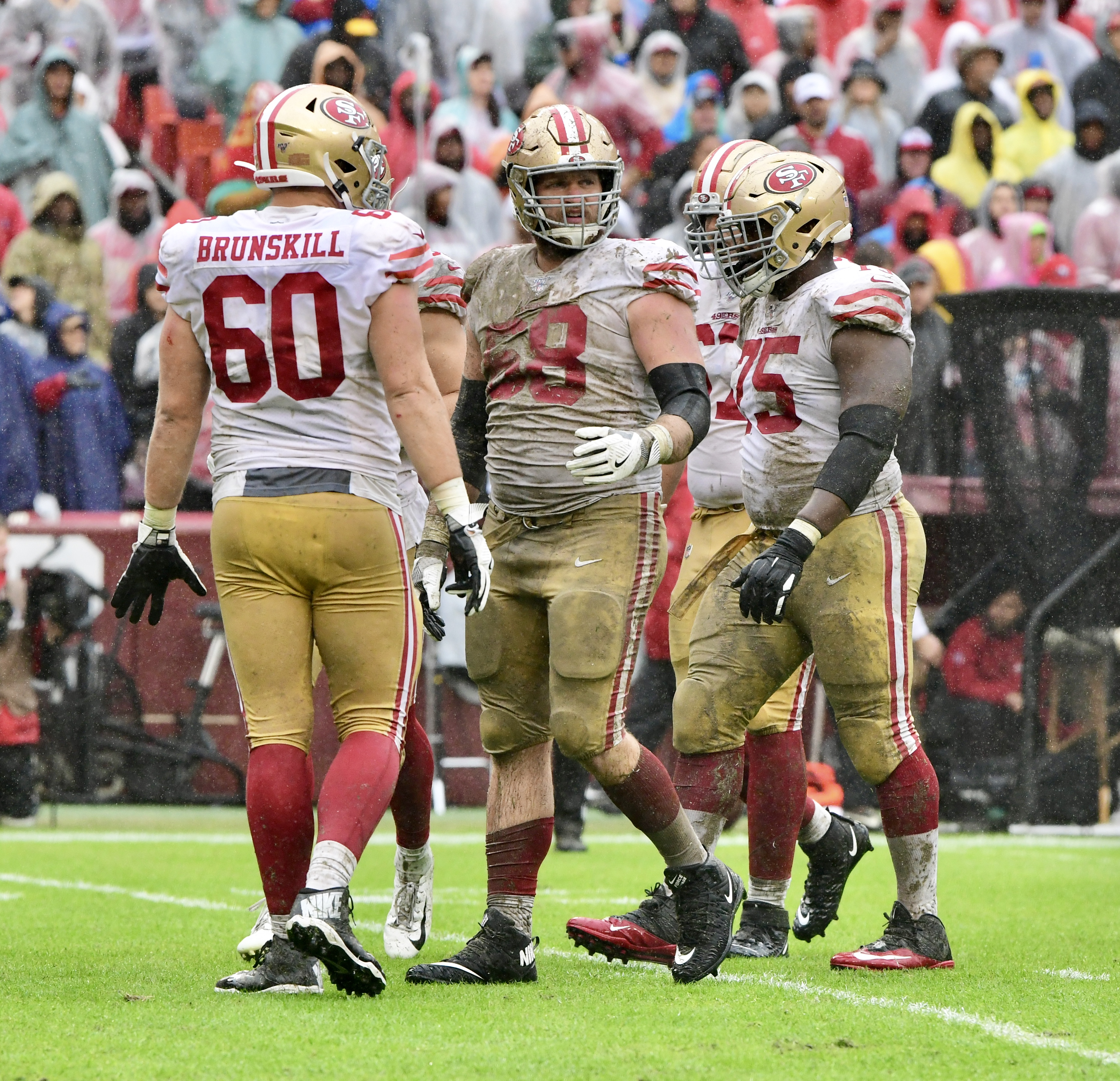
Person with the 49ers in 2019

On March 3, 2019, Person signed a three-year, $9 million contract extension with the 49ers. In 2019, the 49ers reached Super Bowl LIV, but lost 31-20 to the Kansas City Chiefs.

On April 1, 2020, Person was released by the 49ers. Person announced his retirement from professional football on June 28.

== Coaching career ==
In 2022, Person joined Mike McDaniel’s inaugural Dolphins staff as an offensive assistant.
