= Trent Baalke =

American football executive (born 1964)

Cleveland Browns
- Title: Consultant

Personal information
- Born: February 14, 1964 (age 62); Rosendale, Wisconsin, U.S.

Career information
- College: Bemidji State (1982–1985)

Career history

Coaching
- North Dakota State (1989) Graduate assistant; South Dakota State (1990–1995) Defensive line and strength and conditioning coach

Operations
- Shanley High School (1996–1997) Athletic director; New York Jets (1998–2000) Scout; Washington Redskins (2001–2003) National scout; Washington Redskins (2004) College scouting coordinator; San Francisco 49ers (2005–2007) Scout; San Francisco 49ers (2008–2009) Director of player personnel; San Francisco 49ers (2010) Vice president of player personnel; San Francisco 49ers (2011–2016) General manager; National Football League (2017–2019) Football operations consultant; Jacksonville Jaguars (2020) Director of player personnel; Jacksonville Jaguars (2020) Interim general manager; Jacksonville Jaguars (2021–2024) General manager; Cleveland Browns (2026–present) Consultant
- Executive profile at Pro Football Reference

Trent John Baalke (/ˈbɑːlki/ BAHL-kee; born February 14, 1964) is an American football executive who currently serves as a consultant for the Cleveland Browns of the National Football League (NFL). He previously served as the general manager of the Jacksonville Jaguars of the National Football League (NFL).

== Early life ==
A Rosendale, Wisconsin native, Baalke earned his bachelor's degree in health and physical education at Bemidji State University, where he played outside linebacker and was an All-Northern Sun Conference and All-Midwest Region honoree.

== Executive career ==
=== Early career ===
Baalke began his career in coaching in 1989 as a graduate assistant for North Dakota State. From 1990 to 1995, Baalke was a defensive line and strength & conditioning coach for South Dakota State. He then spent two years as the athletic director of Shanley High School in Fargo, North Dakota, before breaking into the NFL as a scout for the New York Jets in 1998, a role in which Baalke spent three seasons.

In 2001, Baalke was hired by the Washington Redskins, spending four years with the team. From 2001 to 2003, he was a national scout, before being promoted to college scouting coordinator in 2004.

=== San Francisco 49ers ===
In 2005, Baalke was hired by the San Francisco 49ers as their western region scout and in 2008, was promoted to director of player personnel, a position largely responsible for overseeing the team's college scouting operations. Baalke was chosen to lead the 49ers in the 2010 NFL draft, in place of Scot McCloughan, and a month later was given the title of vice president of player personnel. Baalke's official promotion to general manager came shortly after the firing of Mike Singletary as head coach of the 49ers, in anticipation of needing an official general manager to lure Jim Harbaugh away from Stanford for the vacant coaching position.

In January 2012, Baalke was named PFWA Executive of the Year for the 2011 season, after being credited for transforming a 6–10 team into a 13–3 team in his first season as general manager. The next month, Baalke received a contract extension through 2016.

After a 2014 season filled with reports that Baalke and then-49ers coach Jim Harbaugh had been clashing, the 49ers parted ways with Harbaugh and promoted defensive line coach Jim Tomsula to the head coaching position. Tomsula led the 49ers to a 5–11 record in 2015 and was fired on January 3, 2016. On January 14, 2016, Chip Kelly was hired as the head coach of the 49ers and led them to a 2–14 record, one of the worst conference records in their franchise history and their worst season since 2004. This led to Baalke and Kelly both being relieved of their duties on January 1, 2017.

=== NFL ===
On August 7, 2017, Baalke was hired as a football operations consultant for the NFL. In this advisory role for NFL, he worked on game-related matters, player development, evaluation, and officiating video review.

=== Jacksonville Jaguars ===
On February 4, 2020, Baalke was hired as director of player personnel of the Jacksonville Jaguars. On November 29, he was promoted to interim general manager following the firing of David Caldwell, and was retained for the role full-time after the season. On January 22, 2025, Baalke was fired after a number of head coach candidates did not want to work with him. Under Baalke as their general manager, the Jaguars had a 25–43 record.

=== Cleveland Browns ===
On May 2, 2026, the Cleveland Browns hired Baalke in a consultant role.
