= C. J. Spillman =

American football player (born 1986)

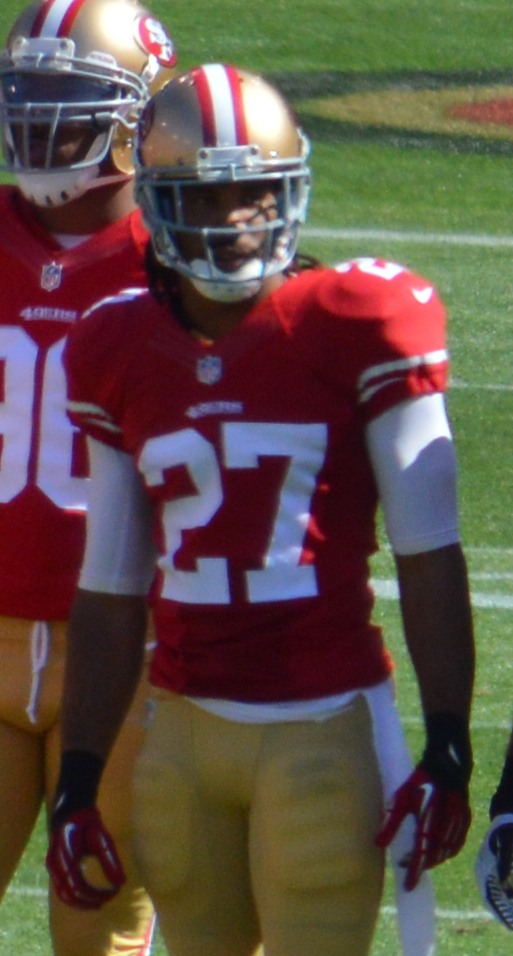
- Spillman with the San Francisco 49ers in 2013

No. 41, 27, 37
- Position: Safety / Special teamer

Personal information
- Born: May 6, 1986 (age 40); Louisville, Kentucky, U.S.
- Listed height: 6 ft 0 in (1.83 m)
- Listed weight: 192 lb (87 kg)

Career information
- High school: Central (Louisville, Kentucky)
- College: Marshall
- NFL draft: 2009: undrafted

Career history
- San Diego Chargers (2009–2010); San Francisco 49ers (2010–2013); Dallas Cowboys (2014)

Awards and highlights
- 2× second-team All-C-USA (2007, 2008)

Career NFL statistics
- Total tackles: 103
- Forced fumbles: 1
- Fumble recoveries: 2
- Stats at Pro Football Reference

Claude Norman "C. J." Spillman Jr. (born May 6, 1986) is an American former professional football player who was a safety and special teamer in the National Football League (NFL). He was signed by the San Diego Chargers as an undrafted free agent in 2009. He played college football at Marshall University.

== Early life ==
Spillman attended Louisville Central High School. He played running back and defensive back while in high school. He was an all-state and all-conference selection in his last two years. He also lettered three years in track.

== College career ==
Spillman became a starter at free safety as a sophomore (9 starts), finishing third on the team with 79 tackles. The next year, he started 12 games, leading the team with 131 tackles (3rd overall in Conference USA and 12th in the nation), while receiving second-team All-Conference USA honors. As a senior, he played with shoulder and hand injuries, while registering 71 tackles (fourth on the team). He finished his college career with the most tackles (319) by a safety in school history.

== Professional career ==
=== San Diego Chargers ===
After going unselected in the 2009 NFL draft, Spillman was as an undrafted free agent signed by the San Diego Chargers on April 27. He was waived on October 11, 2010, after struggling with his play on special teams.

=== San Francisco 49ers ===
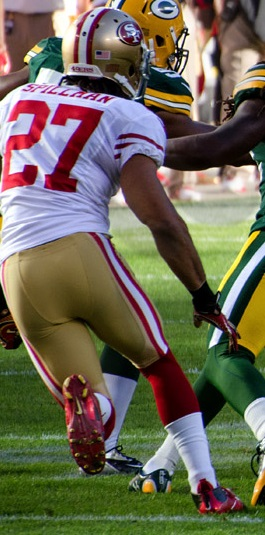
Spillman against the Packers in 2012

The San Francisco 49ers claimed Spillman off waivers on October 12, 2010. He quickly established himself as a standout in the 49ers' special teams units registering 17 tackles after only playing in 11 games. In 2011, he led the team with 19 special teams tackles.

On March 6, 2012, he was signed to a $6 million three-year contract.

At the end of the 2012 season, Spillman and the 49ers appeared in Super Bowl XLVII. He contributed on defense, but the 49ers fell to the Baltimore Ravens by a score of 34–31.

After playing mainly in goal-line defensive packages, during the 2012 and 2013 preseasons, he had a chance to earn the free safety starting job, but couldn't hold the position. In 2013, he led the team with 19 special teams tackles.

He was cut on August 30, 2014.

=== Dallas Cowboys ===
On August 31, 2014, Spillman was signed as a free agent by the Dallas Cowboys. On October 2, it was reported that he was under investigation for sexual assault. Although he had a slow start, by the end of the season he was a valuable contributor, finishing third on team with 10 special teams tackles and also saw more time on defense than expected, after backup safety Jeff Heath missed two games because of a thumb injury. In the playoffs, he raised his production, registering three tackles and two forced fumbles in two games. He was not re-signed at the end of the season.

== Personal life ==
Spillman has three sisters and one brother, Cherisse and Claudia, TaNosha and Justin. His mother Carrie worked for AT&T for 33 years until she retired in 2009. His father, Claude Spillman Sr., a retired Louisville Police Officer, played football at Western Kentucky University. He has a nephew name Deiondre Coleman who also played football for Marshall University as a walk-on until he transferred to Eastern Kentucky University in 2017 to continue his studies. He maintains his offseason home in San Diego.

On July 1, 2016, Spillman was sentenced to five years in jail after being convicted of sexual assault.
