= 2014 San Francisco 49ers season =

American football team season

- Owner: Jed York
- General manager: Trent Baalke
- Head coach: Jim Harbaugh
- Offensive coordinator: Greg Roman
- Defensive coordinator: Vic Fangio
- Home stadium: Levi's Stadium

Results
- Record: 8–8
- Division place: 3rd NFC West
- Playoffs: Did not qualify
- Pro Bowlers: SS Antoine Bethea; G Mike Iupati; OT Joe Staley

Uniform
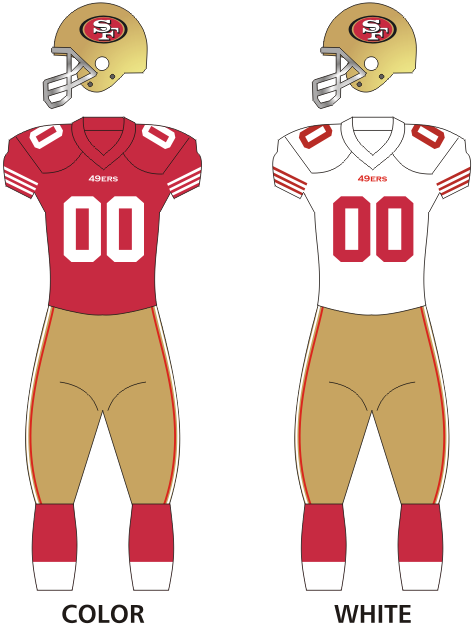

The 2014 season was the San Francisco 49ers' 65th in the National Football League (NFL), their 69th overall, and their fourth and final season under the head coach/general manager tandem of Jim Harbaugh and Trent Baalke. It was also the 49ers' inaugural season playing home games at Levi's Stadium in Santa Clara, California, after playing at Candlestick Park for 42 seasons from 1971 to 2013.

The 49ers were favorites to make another Super Bowl run at the beginning of the season. However, despite a 7–4 start, the 49ers suffered a late-season collapse, losing four of their final five games, and failing to improve on their 12–4 record from 2013. With their loss to the Seattle Seahawks in Week 15, the 49ers were mathematically eliminated from the postseason for the first time since the 2010 season. After the season ended, it was announced that Jim Harbaugh and the 49ers mutually agreed to end his contract with the team, which Harbaugh later disputed.

Despite missing significant starters on the defensive side of the ball due to injuries for most of the season (including Pro Bowlers NaVorro Bowman and Patrick Willis), the 49ers still finished with the NFL's fifth ranked defense in terms of total yards. They also led the league in interceptions with 23, led by cornerback Perrish Cox, who had five. The 49ers defense also finished fourth in the league in total takeaways with 29. The offense, on the other hand, struggled mightily. The 49ers finished 30th in passing yards per game, 25th in the league averaging just 19.1 points per game, while Colin Kaepernick was sacked 52 times during the season, a team record. From Weeks 7–15, the 49ers averaged just 13.8 points per game, last in the league. During that same stretch, they hit the twenty-point mark just once. They were also outscored by 81 points in the second half of games, and scored just one offensive touchdown in the fourth quarter all year. As a result, offensive coordinator Greg Roman was fired after the season ended.

== Offseason ==
=== Roster changes ===
==== Free agents ====
Position	Player	Tag	2014 Team	Notes
WR	Anquan Boldin	UFA	San Francisco 49ers	Signed 2-year/$12 million deal
SS	Donte Whitner	UFA	Cleveland Browns	Signed 4-year/$28 million deal
CB	Tarell Brown	UFA	Oakland Raiders	Signed 2-year/$6 million deal
CB	Perrish Cox	RFA	San Francisco 49ers	
K	Phil Dawson	UFA	San Francisco 49ers	Signed 2-year/$6 million deal
RB	Anthony Dixon	UFA	Buffalo Bills	Signed 3-year/$3.5 million deal
DE	Demarcus Dobbs	RFA	San Francisco 49ers	Tendered one-year contract
C	Jonathan Goodwin	UFA	New Orleans Saints	Signed a 1-year deal
WR	Mario Manningham	UFA	New York Giants	Signed with the Giants March 18
QB	Colt McCoy	UFA	Washington Redskins	Signed with the Redskins April 3
FB	Bruce Miller	UFA	San Francisco 49ers	Signed 3-year extension
WR	Kassim Osgood	UFA	San Francisco 49ers	Signed one-year deal
LB	Michael Wilhoite	ERFA	San Francisco 49ers	Tendered one-year contract
CB	Eric Wright	UFA	San Francisco 49ers	Signed one-year deal

==== Signings ====
Position	Player	2013 Team	Notes
SS	Antoine Bethea	Indianapolis Colts	signed March 11
CB	Chris Cook	Minnesota Vikings	signed March 14
QB	Blaine Gabbert	Jacksonville Jaguars	traded March 11 for 6th round draft pick
OT	Jonathan Martin	Miami Dolphins	traded March 11 for conditional draft pick
WR	Brandon Lloyd	Retired	signed April 15
WR	Stevie Johnson	Buffalo Bills	traded May 9 for conditional draft pick
LB	Blake Costanzo	Chicago Bears	Signed June 3

==== Departures ====
Position	Player	2014 Team	Notes
CB	Carlos Rogers	Oakland Raiders	released March 10
CB	Eric Wright		retired June 17
RB	LaMichael James		released September 8
RB	Marcus Lattimore		retired November 5

== 2014 NFL draft ==
San Francisco 49ers 2014 NFL Draft selections
Draft order			Player name	Position	Height	Weight	College	Notes
Round	Choice	Overall	Player name	Position	Height	Weight	College	Notes
1	30	30	Jimmie Ward	Safety	5'11"	193	NIU	
2	24	56	Traded to the Denver Broncos^{[b]}					From Chiefs^{[a]}
2	25	57	Carlos Hyde	Running back	6'0"	230	Ohio State	From Dolphins^{[c]}
2	29	61	Traded to the Jacksonville Jaguars^{[d]}					
2	31	63	Traded to the Miami Dolphins^{[c]}					From Broncos^{[b]}
3	6	70	Marcus Martin	Center	6'3"	320	USC	From Jaguars^{[d]}
3	13	77	Chris Borland	Linebacker	5'11"	248	Wisconsin	From Titans^{[e]}
3	30	94	Traded to the Cleveland Browns^{[f]}					
3	36	100	Brandon Thomas	Offensive tackle	6'3"	317 lbs	Clemson	Compensatory pick
4	6	106	Bruce Ellington	Wide receiver	5'9"	197 lbs	South Carolina	From Browns^{[f]}
4	29	129	Dontae Johnson	Cornerback	6'2"	195 lbs	NC State	
5	10	150	Aaron Lynch	Outside linebacker	6'5"	250 lbs	South Florida	From Jaguars^{[d]}
5	30	170	Keith Reaser	Cornerback	6'0"	180 lbs	Florida Atlantic	
5	31	171	Traded to the Miami Dolphins^{[c]}					From Broncos^{[b]}
6	4	180	Kenneth Acker	Cornerback	6'0"	185 lbs	SMU	From Browns^{[f]}
6	29	205	Traded to the Jacksonville Jaguars^{[g]}					
7	27	242	Traded to the Denver Broncos^{[b]}					From Saints^{[h]}
7	28	243	Kaleb Ramsey	Defensive tackle	6'1"	300 lbs	Boston College	From Panthers^{[i]}
7	30	245	Trey Millard	Fullback	5'10"	239 lbs	Oklahoma	

Notes

^{^[a]} The 49ers acquired an additional second-round selection (No. 56 overall) as part of a trade that sent quarterback Alex Smith to the Kansas City Chiefs. The Chiefs originally sent a third-round selection to the 49ers, however, the selection was upgraded to a second-rounder after a condition was met in which the Chiefs won a minimum of eight games during the 2013 season.
^{^[b]} The Broncos traded their second- and fifth-round selections in 2014 (Nos. 63 and 171 overall, respectively) as well a fifth-round selection in the 2015 NFL draft to the 49ers in exchange for a second- and seventh-round selection (Nos. 56 and 242 overall).
^{^[c]} The 49ers traded the second- and fifth-round selections they acquired from Denver^{[b]} to Miami in exchange for Miami's second-round selection (No. 57 overall)
^{^[d]} Jacksonville traded their third- and fifth-round selections (Nos. 70 and 150 overall) to the 49ers in exchange for the 49ers second-round selection (No. 61 overall).
^{^[e]} The 49ers acquired an additional third-round selection (No. 77 overall) as part of a trade that sent their 2013 third-round selection to the Tennessee Titans.
^{^[f]} Cleveland traded their fourth- and sixth-round selections (Nos. 106 and 180 overall) to the 49ers in exchange for the 49ers third-round selection (No. 95 overall).
^{^[g]} The 49ers traded their sixth-round selection (No. 205 overall) to the Jacksonville Jaguars in exchange for quarterback Blaine Gabbert.
^{^[h]} The 49ers acquired an additional seventh-round selection as (No. 242 overall) part of a trade that sent linebacker Parys Haralson to the New Orleans Saints.
^{^[i]} The 49ers acquired an additional seventh-round selection (No. 243 overall) as part of a trade that sent safety Colin Jones to the Carolina Panthers.

=== Undrafted free agents ===
Position	Player	College	Notes
QB	Kory Faulkner	SIU	waived July 29
LB	Shayne Skov	Stanford	waived August 30
TE	Asante Cleveland	Miami	waived August 30
LB	Morgan Breslin	USC	waived May 27
S	LJ McCray	Catawba College	made the 53-man roster
OT	Fou Fonoti	Michigan State	waived July 29
C	Dillon Farrell	New Mexico	made the 53-man roster
RB	Glenn Winston	Michigan State	waived August 30
OT	Michael Phillipp	Oregon State	waived August 30
TE	Kevin Greene	USC	waived August 25

== Staff ==
2014 San Francisco 49ers staff
Front office: Co-chairman – Denise DeBartolo York; Co-chairman – John York; Chief executive officer – Jed York; Co-owner – Gideon Yu; President – Paraag Marathe; Chief operating officer – Al Guido; General manager – Trent Baalke; Director of pro personnel – Mike Williams; Director of college scouting – Matt Malaspina; Director of football administration – Brian Hampton; Head coaches: Head coach – Jim Harbaugh; Offensive coaches: Offensive coordinator – Greg Roman; Quarterbacks – Geep Chryst; Running backs – Tom Rathman; Wide receivers – John Morton; Tight ends – Eric Mangini; Offensive line – Mike Solari; Offensive line assistant – Reggie Davis; Offensive assistant – Ronald Curry; Offensive assistant – Richmond Flowers	Defensive coaches: Defensive coordinator – Vic Fangio; Defensive line – Jim Tomsula; Linebackers – Jim Leavitt; Secondary – Ed Donatell; Assistant secondary – Greg Jackson; Defensive assistant – Ejiro Evero; Defensive assistant – Mick Lombardi; Special teams coaches: Assistant head coach/special teams coordinator – Brad Seely; Special teams assistant – Tracy Smith; Strength and conditioning: Head strength and conditioning – Mark Uyeyama; Assistant strength and conditioning – Kevin Tolbert

== Final roster ==
2014 San Francisco 49ers roster
Quarterbacks (QB): 2 Blaine Gabbert; 1 Josh Johnson; 7 Colin Kaepernick; Running backs (RB): 21 Frank Gore; 28 Carlos Hyde; 49 Bruce Miller FB; 38 Alfonso Smith; 48 Phillip Tanner; Wide receivers (WR): 81 Anquan Boldin; 15 Michael Crabtree; 10 Bruce Ellington RS; 19 Trindon Holliday; 13 Stevie Johnson; 84 Brandon Lloyd; 11 Quinton Patton; Tight ends (TE): 45 Asante Cleveland; 85 Vernon Davis	Offensive linemen (OL): 76 Anthony Davis T; 56 Dillon Farrell G/C; 77 Mike Iupati G; 78 Joe Looney G/C; 71 Jonathan Martin T; 66 Marcus Martin C; 74 Joe Staley T; 61 Andrew Tiller G; Defensive linemen (DL): 95 Tank Carradine DE; 92 Quinton Dial NT; 63 Tony Jerod-Eddie DE; 64 Mike Purcell NT; 94 Justin Smith DE	Linebackers (LB): 44 Desmond Bishop ILB; 55 Ahmad Brooks OLB; 96 Corey Lemonier OLB; 59 Aaron Lynch OLB; 54 Nick Moody ILB; 51 Dan Skuta OLB; 99 Aldon Smith OLB; 58 Chase Thomas OLB; 57 Michael Wilhoite ILB; Defensive backs (DB): 41 Antoine Bethea SS; 26 Tramaine Brock CB; 20 Perrish Cox CB; 47 Marcus Cromartie CB; 29 Chris Culliver CB; 43 Craig Dahl FS; 40 Cameron Fuller CB; 36 Dontae Johnson CB; 31 L. J. McCray SS; 30 Leon McFadden CB; 35 Eric Reid FS; Special teams (ST): 9 Phil Dawson K; 4 Andy Lee P; 86 Kyle Nelson LS	Practice squad: 40 Kendall Gaskins RB; 83 Xavier Grimble TE; 18 Lance Lewis WR; 69 Chris Martin T; 98 Lawrence Okoye DE; 48 Shayne Skov LB; 91 Garrison Smith NT; Reserve: 24 Kenneth Acker CB (IR); 75 Alex Boone G (IR); 50 Chris Borland ILB (IR); 53 NaVorro Bowman ILB (IR); 46 Derek Carrier TE (IR); 22 Chris Cook CB (IR); 90 Glenn Dorsey NT (IR); 62 Fou Fonoti G (IR); 88 Garrett Celek TE (IR); 32 Kendall Hunter RB (IR); 17 Chuck Jacobs WR (IR); 67 Daniel Kilgore C (IR); 89 Vance McDonald TE (IR); 33 Trey Millard FB (NF-Inj.); 14 Kassim Osgood WR (IR); 60 Kaleb Ramsey DE (PUP); 27 Keith Reaser CB (NF-Inj.); 60 Brandon Thomas G (NF-Inj.); 23 Ray Ventrone SS (IR); 25 Jimmie Ward SS (IR); 93 Ian Williams NT (IR); 52 Patrick Willis ILB (IR); Rookies in italics 53 active, 22 reserve, 7 practice squad

== Schedule ==
=== Preseason ===
Week	Date	Opponent	Result	Record	Venue	Recap
1	August 7	at Baltimore Ravens	**L** 3–23	0–1	M&T Bank Stadium	Recap
2	August 17	Denver Broncos	**L** 0–34	0–2	Levi's Stadium	Recap
3	August 24	San Diego Chargers	**W** 21–7	1–2	Levi's Stadium	Recap
4	August 28	at Houston Texans	**W** 40–13	2–2	NRG Stadium	Recap

=== Regular season ===
San Francisco began the season strong at 4–2, but struggled heavily down the stretch as they lost 6 of their last 10 to fall out of contention. The 49ers entered the season looking to improve on their 12–4 record from the previous year, but by Week 9 had exceeded their loss total from the season before and had a non-winning record for the first time since their 2010 campaign. In Week 15, the 49ers were eliminated from playoff contention with a loss to Seattle. Although the 49ers has the fourth ranked defense in the league for 2014, the 49ers offense finished at the bottom five in many offensive categories. From Weeks 7–15, the 49ers were last in the league in points scored, averaging 13.9 points per game and scoring 20 or more points just once (in a Week 10 win against New Orleans). Colin Kaepernick was sacked more than 30 times during that stretch and the 49ers were outscored in the second half of 7 out of those 8 games by a wide margin.

Week	Date	Opponent	Result	Record	Venue	Recap
1	September 7	at Dallas Cowboys	**W** 28–17	1–0	AT&T Stadium	Recap
2	September 14	Chicago Bears	**L** 20–28	1–1	Levi's Stadium	Recap
3	September 21	at **Arizona Cardinals**	**L** 14–23	1–2	University of Phoenix Stadium	Recap
4	September 28	Philadelphia Eagles	**W** 26–21	2–2	Levi's Stadium	Recap
5	October 5	Kansas City Chiefs	**W** 22–17	3–2	Levi's Stadium	Recap
6	October 13	at **St. Louis Rams**	**W** 31–17	4–2	Edward Jones Dome	Recap
7	October 19	at Denver Broncos	**L** 17–42	4–3	Sports Authority Field at Mile High	Recap
8	Bye					
9	November 2	**St. Louis Rams**	**L** 10–13	4–4	Levi's Stadium	Recap
10	November 9	at New Orleans Saints	**W** 27–24 (OT)	5–4	Mercedes-Benz Superdome	Recap
11	November 16	at New York Giants	**W** 16–10	6–4	MetLife Stadium	Recap
12	November 23	Washington Redskins	**W** 17–13	7–4	Levi's Stadium	Recap
13	November 27	**Seattle Seahawks**	**L** 3–19	7–5	Levi's Stadium	Recap
14	December 7	at Oakland Raiders	**L** 13–24	7–6	O.co Coliseum	Recap
15	December 14	at **Seattle Seahawks**	**L** 7–17	7–7	CenturyLink Field	Recap
16	December 20	San Diego Chargers	**L** 35–38 (OT)	7–8	Levi's Stadium	Recap
17	December 28	**Arizona Cardinals**	**W** 20–17	8–8	Levi's Stadium	Recap
Note: Intra-division opponents are in **bold** text.

=== Game summaries ===
==== Week 1: at Dallas Cowboys ====
Week One: San Francisco 49ers at Dallas Cowboys – Game summary

Quarter	1	2	3	4	Total
**49ers**	21	7	0	0	**28**
Cowboys	3	0	7	7	**17**

at AT&T Stadium, Arlington, Texas

- Date: September 7, 2014
- Game time: 3:25 p.m. CDT
- Game weather: Played indoors (retractable roof closed)
- Game attendance: 91,174
- Referee: Terry McAulay
- TV announcers (Fox): Joe Buck, Troy Aikman and Erin Andrews
- Recap, Gamebook

Game information

**First quarter**

- SF – Chris Culliver 35-yard fumble return (Phil Dawson kick), 14:06. 49ers 7–0.
- DAL – Dan Bailey 29-yard field goal, 7:22. 49ers 7–3. **Drive: 11 plays, 69 yards, 6:44.**
- SF – Vernon Davis 29-yard pass from Colin Kaepernick (Phil Dawson kick), 5:54. 49ers 14–3. **Drive: 3 plays, 80 yards, 1:28.**
- SF – Vernon Davis 2-yard pass from Colin Kaepernick (Phil Dawson kick), 4:25. 49ers 21–3. **Drive: 1 play, 2 yards, 0:06.**

**Second quarter**

- SF – Carlos Hyde 4-yard run (Phil Dawson kick), 0:39. 49ers 28–3. **Drive: 9 plays, 64 yards, 3:00.**

**Third quarter**

- DAL – DeMarco Murray 2-yard run (Dan Bailey kick), 0:29. 49ers 28–10. **Drive: 14 plays, 87 yards, 6:56.**

**Fourth quarter**

- DAL – Terrance Williams 2-yard pass from Tony Romo (Dan Bailey kick), 1:52. 49ers 28–17. **Drive: 11 plays, 73 yards, 3:45.**

**Top Passers**

- SF – Colin Kaepernick – 16/23, 201 yards, 2 TD
- DAL – Tony Romo – 23/37, 281 yards, TD, 3 INT

**Top Rushers**

- SF – Frank Gore – 16 rushes, 66 yards
- DAL – DeMarco Murray – 22 rushes, 118 yards, TD

**Top Receivers**

- SF – Anquan Boldin – 8 receptions, 99 yards
- DAL – Dwayne Harris – 1 reception, 56 yards

===== Game Notes =====
The 49ers scored touchdowns on each of three Cowboys turnovers, all in the first quarter. Even though the Cowboys held a significant edge in 1st-quarter time of possession (13:26 to 1:34), the 49ers had a 21–3 lead due to the turnovers. With the 49ers up 28–3, the Cowboys found themselves with their largest halftime deficit in a home opener ever. Although the 49ers did not score again in the second half, they held the Cowboys to only 14 more points, and won the game.

==== Week 2: vs. Chicago Bears ====
Week Two: Chicago Bears at San Francisco 49ers – Game summary

Quarter	1	2	3	4	Total
**Bears**	0	7	0	21	**28**
49ers	10	7	3	0	**20**

at Levi's Stadium, Santa Clara, California

- Date: September 14
- Game time: 5:30 pm. PDT
- Game weather: 78 °F (26 °C), sunny
- Game attendance: 70,799
- Referee: Carl Cheffers
- TV announcers (NBC): Al Michaels, Cris Collinsworth and Michele Tafoya
- Recap, Gamebook

Game information

**First quarter**

- SF – Michael Crabtree 3-yard pass from Colin Kaepernick, Phil Dawson kick, 12:42 (SF 7–0)
- SF – Phil Dawson 27-yard field goal, 2:48 (SF 10–0)

**Second quarter**

- SF – Frank Gore 8-yard run, Phil Dawson kick, 2:22 (SF 17–0)
- CHI – Brandon Marshall 17-yard pass from Jay Cutler, Robbie Gould kick, 0:13 (SF 17–7)

**Third quarter**

- SF – Phil Dawson 24-yard field goal, 5:56 (SF 20–7)

**Fourth quarter**

- CHI – Brandon Marshall 5-yard pass from Jay Cutler, Robbie Gould kick, 13:35 (SF 20–14)
- CHI – Martellus Bennett 3-yard pass from Jay Cutler, Robbie Gould kick, 13:14 (CHI 21–20)
- CHI – Brandon Marshall 3-yard pass from Jay Cutler, Robbie Gould kick, 6:55 (CHI 28–20)

**Top passers**

- CHI – Jay Cutler, 23/34, 176 Yds, 4 TD
- SF – Colin Kaepernick, 21/34, 248 Yds, 1 TD, 3 Int

**Top rushers**

- CHI – Jay Cutler, 5 Car, 25 Yds
- SF – Colin Kaepernick, 9 Car, 66 Yds

**Top receivers**

- CHI – Martellus Bennett, 7 Rec, 37 Yds, 1 TD
- SF – Michael Crabtree, 7 Rec, 82 Yds, 1 TD

**Top tacklers**

- CHI – Ryan Mundy, 6 Solo, 1 Ast
- SF – Patrick Willis, 7 Solo, 1 Ast

In a pattern similar to the Dallas game of week one, the Niners jumped out to an early 17–0 lead, only to fall victim to a hailstorm of penalties, turnovers and a strong Bears comeback, 28–20. A blocked punt led to a Niner touchdown in the third minute of the game, but a seven-minute drive later in the quarter stalled in the red zone and only yielded a field goal. After a short punt in the second quarter, the Niners scored a second touchdown, but Chicago answered with their first touchdown just before halftime. To start the third quarter, the Niners held the ball for more than nine minutes. But they once again failed in the red zone, and settled for another field goal. The Bears scored three touchdowns in the second half to emerge with the win. The Niners were called on 16 penalties for 118 yards, losing one touchdown run, and keeping Bears' drives alive on multiple occasions. Colin Kaepernick threw three interceptions, lost a fumble, and was called for unsportsmanlike conduct after an interception. The Niners outgained Chicago 361–216, and held the Bears to only 46 rushing yards, but the overwhelming weight of the turnovers and penalties negated any other advantage. The Bears scored touchdowns the last four times they had the ball. This was also the first time since 1985 that the Bears won a road game against the 49ers, ending the Bears' 8-game road losing streak against the 49ers (the Bears were outscored in those 8 losses by a score of 271 to 49).

==== Week 3: at Arizona Cardinals ====
Week Three: San Francisco 49ers at Arizona Cardinals – Game summary

Quarter	1	2	3	4	Total
49ers	7	7	0	0	**14**
**Cardinals**	3	3	14	3	**23**

at University of Phoenix Stadium, Glendale, Arizona

- Date: September 21
- Game time: 1:05 pm. PDT & MST
- Game weather: Played indoors (retractable roof closed)
- Game attendance: 61,572
- Referee: Gene Steratore
- TV announcers (Fox): Thom Brennaman, David Diehl and Laura Okmin
- Recap, Gamebook

Game information

**First quarter**

- ARI – Chandler Catanzaro 51-yard field goal, 12:23 (ARI 3–0)
- SF – Michael Crabtree 2-yard pass from Colin Kaepernick, Phil Dawson kick, 6:45 (SF 7–3)

**Second quarter**

- ARI – Chandler Catanzaro 32-yard field goal, 13:42 (SF 7–6)
- SF – Carlos Hyde 6-yard run, Phil Dawson kick, 5:07 (SF 14–6)

**Third quarter**

- ARI – John Brown 24-yard pass from Drew Stanton, Chandler Catanzaro kick, 9:20 (SF 14–13)
- ARI – John Brown 21-yard pass from Drew Stanton, Chandler Catanzaro kick, 4:39 (ARI 20–14)

**Fourth quarter**

- ARI – Chandler Catanzaro 35-yard field goal, 0:29 (ARI 23–14)

**Top passers**

- SF – Colin Kaepernick, 29/37, 245 Yds, 1 TD
- ARI – Drew Stanton, 18/33, 244 Yds, 2 TD

**Top rushers**

- SF – Colin Kaepernick, 12 Car, 54 Yds
- ARI – Andre Ellington, 18 Car, 62 Yds

**Top receivers**

- SF – Michael Crabtree, 10 Rec, 80 Yds, 1 TD
- ARI – Michael Floyd, 5 Rec, 114 Yds

**Top tacklers**

- SF – Michael Wilhoite, 5 Solo, 1 Ast, 1 PD, Patrick Willis, 5 Solo, 1 Ast
- ARI – Tony Jefferson, 8 Solo, 2 Ast, 1 Sack

For the third straight game, the Niners jumped out to an early lead, only to be shut out for the remainder of the game. And for the second straight game, mistakes and penalties allowed their opponent to take the victory. The Niners had pulled out to a 14–6 lead with 5:07 remaining in the second quarter, but saw the Cardinals score 17 unanswered points for a 23–14 victory. The Niners failed to score the last six times they had the ball, and racked up nine penalties for 107 yards, mostly in the second half.

==== Week 4: vs. Philadelphia Eagles ====
Week Four: Philadelphia Eagles at San Francisco 49ers – Game summary

Quarter	1	2	3	4	Total
Eagles	7	14	0	0	**21**
**49ers**	3	10	10	3	**26**

at Levi's Stadium, Santa Clara, California

- Date: September 28
- Game time: 1:25 pm. PDT
- Game weather: 72 °F (22 °C), sunny
- Game attendance: 70,799
- Referee: Ed Hochuli
- TV announcers (Fox): Joe Buck, Troy Aikman and Erin Andrews
- Recap, Gamebook

Game information

**First quarter**

- PHI – Brad Smith blocked punt recovery in end zone, Cody Parkey kick, 12:19 (PHI 7–0)
- SF – Phil Dawson 29-yard field goal, 3:32 (PHI 7–3)

**Second quarter**

- SF – Frank Gore 5-yard pass from Colin Kaepernick, Phil Dawson kick, 14:45 (SF 10–7)
- PHI – Malcolm Jenkins 53-yard interception return, Cody Parkey kick, 12:02 (PHI 14–10)
- PHI – Darren Sproles 82-yard punt return, Cody Parkey kick, 8:49 (PHI 21–10)
- SF – Phil Dawson 51-yard field goal, 0:59 (PHI 21–13)

**Third quarter**

- SF – Stevie Johnson 12-yard pass from Colin Kaepernick, Phil Dawson kick, 8:06 (PHI 21–20)
- SF – Phil Dawson 46-yard field goal, 3:33 (SF 23–21)

**Fourth quarter**

- SF – Phil Dawson 31-yard field goal, 6:35 (SF 26–21)

**Top passers**

- PHI – Nick Foles, 21/43, 195 Yds, 2 Int
- SF – Colin Kaepernick, 17/30, 218 Yds, 2 TD, 1 Int

**Top rushers**

- PHI – LeSean McCoy, 10 Car, 17 Yds
- SF – Frank Gore, 24 Car, 119 Yds

**Top receivers**

- PHI – Riley Cooper, 6 Rec, 54 Yds
- SF – Anquan Boldin, 5 Rec, 62 Yds, Michael Crabtree, 5 Rec, 43 Yds

**Top tacklers**

- PHI – Cary Williams, 7 Solo, DeMeco Ryans, 7 Solo
- SF – Antoine Bethea, 7 Solo, 1 INT, 1 FF, 1 PD

The Niners broke the pattern of their first three games, and mounted a second-half comeback to beat the Eagles (the 49ers trailed 21–10 in the second quarter). Philadelphia exploited Niner mistakes to score first-half touchdowns on a blocked punt recovery, an interception return and a punt return. But the defense never allowed a point by the Eagles offense, who had led the league in scoring through the first 3 weeks of the season, and on the strength of two Colin Kaepernick touchdown passes and four Phil Dawson field goals, the 49ers took a late 26–21 lead. Late in the game the Eagles moved to the Niner one-yard line, but they turned the ball over on downs, and the Niners held on for the win. The Niners outgained the Eagles 407–213, and held the ball for 42:17.

==== Week 5: vs. Kansas City Chiefs ====
Week Five: Kansas City Chiefs at San Francisco 49ers – Game summary

Quarter	1	2	3	4	Total
Chiefs	7	3	7	0	**17**
**49ers**	3	10	3	6	**22**

at Levi's Stadium, Santa Clara, California

- Date: October 5
- Game time: 1:25 pm. PDT
- Game weather: 85 °F (29 °C), sunny
- Game attendance: 70,799
- Referee: Walt Coleman
- TV announcers (CBS): Jim Nantz, Phil Simms and Tracy Wolfson
- Recap, Gamebook

Game information

**First quarter**

- KC – Travis Kelce 2-yard pass from Alex Smith (Cairo Santos kick), 8:42. Chiefs 7–0. **Drive: 12 plays, 81 yards, 6:23.**
- SF – Phil Dawson 31-yard field goal, 4:41. Chiefs 7–3. **Drive: 10 plays, 59 yards, 4:01.**

**Second quarter**

- KC – Cairo Santos 42-yard field goal, 12:20. Chiefs 10–3. **Drive: 14 plays, 63 yards, 7:18.**
- SF – Phil Dawson 55-yard field goal, 9:49. Chiefs 10–6. **Drive: 7 plays, 44 yards, 2:34.**
- SF – Stevie Johnson 9-yard pass from Colin Kaepernick (Phil Dawson kick), 0:35. 49ers 13–10. **Drive: 13 plays, 93 yards, 6:39.**

**Third quarter**

- KC – De'Anthony Thomas 17-yard run (Cairo Santos kick), 12:05. Chiefs 17–13. **Drive: 4 plays, 58 yards, 1:31.**
- SF – Phil Dawson 52-yard field goal, 6:21. Chiefs 17–16. **Drive: 9 plays, 43 yards, 5:40.**

**Fourth quarter**

- SF – Phil Dawson 27-yard field goal, 8:46. 49ers 19–17. **Drive: 13 plays, 71 yards, 6:55.**
- SF – Phil Dawson 30-yard field goal, 2:17. 49ers 22–17. **Drive: 14 plays, 56 yards, 4:58.**

**Top passers**

- KC – Alex Smith – 16/30, 158 yards, TD, INT
- SF – Colin Kaepernick – 14/26, 201 yards, TD

**Top rushers**

- KC – Jamaal Charles – 15 rushes, 80 yards
- SF – Frank Gore – 18 rushes, 107 yards

**Top receivers**

- KC – Junior Hemingway – 4 receptions, 50 yards
- SF – Brandon Lloyd – 3 receptions, 76 yards

**Top tacklers**

- KC – James-Michael Johnson – 9 tackles, 2 assists, 1 forced fumble
- SF – Patrick Willis – 6 tackles, 2 assists, 1 pass defended

In a game that saw the return of former 49er QB Alex Smith to the Bay Area, the Niners prevailed in a see-saw game, 22–17, on the strength of five Phil Dawson field goals. Kansas City took an early lead on a touchdown pass from Smith to Travis Kelce, but Colin Kaepernick hit Stevie Johnson with a TD pass just before halftime to give the 49ers a 13–10 lead. Smith struck again in the third quarter with a 17-yard scoring pass to De'Anthony Thomas, but Dawson hit three more field goals to give the Niners the win. The Niners outgained the Chiefs 357–264, and had a 36:04–23:56 time of possession advantage, but they only scored one touchdown in four trips into the red zone, continuing their season-long problem in that area. As of 2024, this marks the 49ers last win against Kansas City.

==== Week 6: at St. Louis Rams ====
Week Six: San Francisco 49ers at St. Louis Rams – Game summary

Quarter	1	2	3	4	Total
**49ers**	0	10	14	7	**31**
Rams	14	0	0	3	**17**

at Edward Jones Dome, St. Louis, Missouri

- Date: October 13
- Game time: 7:30 pm. CDT/5:30 pm. PDT
- Game weather: Played indoors (dome stadium)
- Game attendance: 56,851
- Referee: Craig Wrolstad
- TV announcers (ESPN): Mike Tirico, Jon Gruden and Lisa Salters
- Recap, Gamebook

Game information

**First quarter**

- STL – Benny Cunningham 1 yard run, Greg Zuerlein kick, 7:55 (STL 7–0)
- STL – Lance Kendricks 22-yard pass from Austin Davis, Greg Zuerlein kick, 0:53 (STL 14–0)

**Second quarter**

- SF – Phil Dawson 51-yard field goal, 7:07 (STL 14–3)
- SF – Brandon Lloyd 80-yard pass from Colin Kaepernick, Phil Dawson kick, 0:14 (STL 14–10)

**Third quarter**

- SF – Anquan Boldin 11-yard pass from Colin Kaepernick, Phil Dawson kick, 9:58 (SF 17–14)
- SF – Michael Crabtree 32-yard pass from Colin Kaepernick, Phil Dawson kick, 0:13 (SF 24–14)

**Fourth quarter**

- STL – Greg Zuerlein 38-yard field goal, 2:24 (SF 24–17)
- SF – Dontae Johnson 20-yard interception return, Phil Dawson kick, 0:53 (SF 31–17)

**Top passers**

- SF – Colin Kaepernick 22/36, 343 Yds, 3 TD
- STL – Austin Davis 21/42, 236 Yds, 1 TD, 1 Int

**Top rushers**

- SF – Frank Gore, 16 Car, 38 Yds
- STL – Tre Mason, 8 Car, 40 Yds

**Top receivers**

- SF – Anquan Boldin, 7 Rec, 94 Yds, 1 TD
- STL – Jared Cook, 4 Rec, 74 Yds

**Top tacklers**

- SF – Antoine Bethea, 5 Solo, 2 Ast, 1 Sack; Ahmad Brooks, 5 Solo, 2 Sacks
- STL – T. J. McDonald, 7 Solo, 3 Ast

After trailing 14–0 in the 1st quarter, the 49ers completely turned the game around, outscoring the Rams 31–3 and winning by a score of 31–17. With :24 left in the first half, the 49ers down 14–3 and getting outplayed on both sides of the ball, Colin Kaepernick hit Brandon Lloyd for an 80-yard touchdown pass that turned the game around and gave the 49ers the momentum. Kaepernick threw for 343 yards and 3 touchdowns and Anquan Boldin had 7 catches for 94 yards and a touchdown. The 49ers defense recorded 5 sacks, matching their season total. It was the first time since 1986 that the 49ers trailed by double digits and then won by double digits (last time was October 26, 1986, vs Green Bay). This was also the second time this season the 49ers erased a double-digit deficit and won. (Week 4 vs. Eagles)

==== Week 7: at Denver Broncos ====
Week Seven: San Francisco 49ers at Denver Broncos – Game summary

Quarter	1	2	3	4	Total
49ers	0	10	0	7	**17**
**Broncos**	14	7	21	0	**42**

at Sports Authority Field at Mile High, Denver, Colorado

- Date: October 19
- Game time: 6:30 p.m. MDT/5:30 pm. PDT
- Game weather: 67 °F (19 °C), mostly clear
- Game attendance: 77,047
- Referee: John Parry
- TV announcers (NBC): Al Michaels, Cris Collinsworth and Michele Tafoya
- Recap, Gamebook

Game information

**First quarter**

- DEN - Emmanuel Sanders 3-yard pass from Peyton Manning, Brandon McManus kick, 8:29 (DEN 7-0)
- DEN - Wes Welker 39-yard pass from Peyton Manning, Brandon McManus kick, 2:57 (DEN 14-0)

**Second quarter**

- SF - Phil Dawson 22-yard field goal, 7:30 (DEN 14-3)
- DEN - Demaryius Thomas 8-yard pass from Peyton Manning, Brandon McManus kick, 3:09 (DEN 21-3)
- SF - Stevie Johnson 4-yard pass from Colin Kaepernick, Phil Dawson kick, 0:11 (DEN 21-10)

**Third quarter**

- DEN - Demaryius Thomas 40-yard pass from Peyton Manning, Brandon McManus kick, 11:48 (DEN 28-10)
- DEN - Ronnie Hillman 37-yard run, Brandon McManus kick, 9:24 (DEN 35-10)
- DEN - Ronnie Hillman 1 yard run, Brandon McManus kick, 1:36 (DEN 42-10)

**Fourth quarter**

- SF - Bruce Ellington 20-yard pass from Blaine Gabbert, Phil Dawson kick, 1:00 (DEN 42-17)

**Top passers**

- SF – Colin Kaepernick, 24/39, 263 yards, 1 TD, 1 INT
- DEN – Peyton Manning, 22/26, 318 yards, 4 TDs

**Top rushers**

- SF – Frank Gore, 9 rushes, 20 yards
- DEN – Ronnie Hillman, 14 rushes, 74 yards, 2TDs

**Top receivers**

- SF – Stevie Johnson, 5 catches, 70 yards, 1 TD
- DEN – Demaryius Thomas, 8 catches, 171 yards, 2 TDs

**Top tacklers**

- SF – Chris Borland, 7 solo, 1 Ast, 1 sack
- DEN – Brandon Marshall, 8 solo, 1 PD

Behind Peyton Manning's four touchdown passes, the Broncos scored early and often, and administered a sound thrashing to the Niners, 42–17. After a Colin Kaepernick to Stevie Johnson touchdown pass closed the halftime margin to 21–10, Denver exploded for three unanswered touchdowns in the third quarter to put the game away early. Manning was 22 of 26 for 318 yards and four touchdowns, with an almost-perfect quarterback rating of 157.2, as this was one of the worst displays of pass defense by the Niners in history. The Bronco defense held the Niners to 62 yards rushing and totally overwhelmed the offensive line.

==== Week 9: vs. St. Louis Rams ====
Week Nine: St. Louis Rams at San Francisco 49ers – Game summary

Quarter	1	2	3	4	Total
**Rams**	3	7	0	3	**13**
49ers	3	7	0	0	**10**

at Levi's Stadium, Santa Clara, California

- Date: November 2
- Game time: 1:05 pm. PST
- Game weather: 61 °F (16 °C), sunny
- Game attendance: 70,799
- Referee: Jerome Boger
- TV announcers (Fox): Kevin Burkhardt, John Lynch and Pam Oliver
- Recap, Gamebook

Game information

**First quarter**

- SF – Phil Dawson 34-yard field goal, 4:28 (SF 3–0)
- STL – Greg Zuerlein 37-yard field goal, 6:08 (T 3–3)

**Second quarter**

- SF – Anquan Boldin 27-yard pass from Colin Kaepernick, Phil Dawson kick, 1:24 (SF 10–3)
- STL – Kenny Britt 21-yard pass from Austin Davis, Greg Zuerlein kick, 0:55 (T 10–10)

**Third quarter**

**Fourth quarter**

- STL – Greg Zuerlein 39-yard field goal, 2:12 (STL 13–10)

**Top passers**

- STL – Austin Davis – 13/24, 105 yards, 1 TD, 2 INTs
- SF – Colin Kaepernick – 22/33, 237 yards, 1 TD

**Top rushers**

- STL – Tre Mason – 19 carries, 65 yards
- SF – Frank Gore – 14 carries, 49 yards

**Top receivers**

- STL – Benjamin Cunningham – 3 receptions, 38 yards
- SF – Anquan Boldin – 6 receptions, 93 yards, 1 TD

**Top tacklers**

- STL – E. J. Gaines - 6 solo, 1 PD; James Laurinaitis - 5 solo, 1 ast, 1 sack
- SF – Chris Borland - 15 solo, 3 ast

Colin Kaepernick fumbled the ball on a quarterback sneak at the Rams 1-yard line with less than 10 seconds remaining in the game, and the Rams held on to upset the Niners, 13–10. The game was a defensive struggle, with both touchdowns scored on drives of less than 40 yards. The 49ers offense continued to struggle, not registering a single point in the 2nd half.

==== Week 10: at New Orleans Saints ====
Week Ten: San Francisco 49ers at New Orleans Saints – Game summary

Quarter	1	2	3	4	OT	Total
**49ers**	14	7	0	3	3	**27**
Saints	3	7	7	7	0	**24**

at Mercedes-Benz Superdome, New Orleans, Louisiana

- Date: November 9
- Game time: 12:00 pm. CST/10:00 am. PST
- Game weather: Played indoors (dome stadium)
- Game attendance: 73,129
- Referee: Bill Vinovich
- TV announcers (Fox): Kevin Burkhardt, John Lynch and Pam Oliver
- Preview, Gamebook

Game information

**First quarter**

- SF – Frank Gore 4-yard run, Phil Dawson kick, 13:01 (SF 7–0)
- SF – Carlos Hyde 9-yard run, Phil Dawson kick, 4:17 (SF 14–0)
- NO – Shayne Graham 40-yard field goal, 0:03 (SF 14–3)

**Second quarter**

- NO – Brandin Cooks 31-yard pass from Drew Brees, Shayne Graham kick, 9:13 (SF 14–10)
- SF – Anquan Boldin 15-yard pass from Colin Kaepernick, Phil Dawson kick, 4:45 (SF 21–10)

**Third quarter**

- NO – Jimmy Graham 11-yard pass from Drew Brees, Shayne Graham kick, 2:49 (SF 21–17)

**Fourth quarter**

- NO – Jimmy Graham 11-yard pass from Drew Brees, Shayne Graham kick, 1:52 (NO 24–21)
- SF – Phil Dawson 45-yard field goal, 0:44 (T 24–24)

**Overtime**

- SF – Phil Dawson 35-yard field goal, 5:14 (SF 27–24)

**Top passers**

- SF – Colin Kaepernick – 14/32, 210 yards, 1 TD
- NO – Drew Brees – 28/47, 292 yards, 3 TDs, 2 Int

**Top rushers**

- SF – Frank Gore – 23 carries, 81 yards, 1 TD
- NO – Mark Ingram II – 27 carries, 120 yards

**Top receivers**

- SF – Anquan Boldin – 6 receptions, 95 yards, 1 TD
- NO – Brandin Cooks – 5 receptions, 90 yards, 1 TD

**Top tacklers**

- SF – Chris Borland – 11 Solo, 6 Ast
- NO – Ramon Humber – 7 Solo, 5 Ast

With the season on the line, the 49ers got off to a quick start, leading 14–0 in the first quarter with a pair of rushing touchdowns by Frank Gore and Carlos Hyde. The Saints rebounded in the 2nd half to take a 24–21 lead. With 1:34 to go, and the 49ers facing 4th and 10 from their own 22-yard line, Colin Kaepernick found a wide open Michael Crabtree for a 51-yard gain that set up the game-tying field goal. On the last play of regulation, the Saints appeared to have scored on a Hail Mary pass from Drew Brees, but the play was overturned by offensive pass interference. In overtime, Ahmad Brooks sacked Brees, causing a fumble recovered by the 49ers' Chris Borland on the Saints' 17. On the very next play, Phil Dawson kicked the game-winning field goal, giving the Niners a 27–24 win. This was the Saints' first home loss in 12 games, and the first home loss under Sean Payton in 20 games (Payton was suspended for all of the 2012 season).

==== Week 11: at New York Giants ====
Week Eleven: San Francisco 49ers at New York Giants – Game summary

Quarter	1	2	3	4	Total
**49ers**	3	6	7	0	**16**
Giants	7	0	3	0	**10**

at MetLife Stadium, East Rutherford, New Jersey

- Date: November 16
- Game time: 1:00 p.m. EST/10:00 am. PST
- Game weather: 42 °F (6 °C), cloudy
- Game attendance: 80,352
- Referee: Gene Steratore
- TV announcers (Fox): Kevin Burkhardt, John Lynch and Pam Oliver
- Recap, Gamebook

Game information

**First quarter**

- NYG - Larry Donnell 19-yard pass from Eli Manning, Josh Brown kick, 6:54 (NYG 7-0)
- SF - Phil Dawson 31-yard field goal, 0:59 (NYG 7-3)

**Second quarter**

- SF - Phil Dawson 37-yard field goal, 10:15 (NYG 7-6)
- SF - Phil Dawson 44-yard field goal, 7:29 (SF 9-7)

**Third quarter**

- SF - Michael Crabtree 48-yard pass from Colin Kaepernick, Phil Dawson kick, 11:38 (SF 16-7)
- NYG - Josh Brown 43-yard field goal, 0:59 (SF 16-10)

**Fourth quarter**

- No scoring plays

**Top passers**

- SF – Colin Kaepernick 15/29, 193 Yds, 1 TD
- NYG – Eli Manning 22/45, 280 Yds, 1 TD, 5 Ints

**Top rushers**

- SF – Frank Gore 19 Carries, 95 Yds
- NYG – Rashad Jennings 18 Carries, 59 Yds

**Top receivers**

- SF – Michael Crabtree 3 Rec, 85 Yds, 1 TD; Anquan Boldin 5 Rec, 53 Yds
- NYG – Rueben Randle 7 Rec, 112 Yds

**Top tacklers**

- SF – Ray McDonald 5 Solo, 2 Ast, 1 Sack
- NYG – Jameel McClain 11 Solo, 3 Ast

With the 49ers offense continuing to struggle in the game, the defense more than made up for it. The 49ers defense intercepted Giants QB Eli Manning 5 times and sacked him twice. In the 4th quarter, with the 49ers holding a 16–10 lead, the Giants marched down the field to the 49ers' 4-yard line with 5:25 left to play. The 49ers defense forced 3 incomplete passes and rookie linebacker Chris Borland intercepted Eli Manning's throw on 4th and goal to preserve the win. This was the second time this season the 49ers defense had a goal line stand late in a game (Week 4 vs Eagles). Colin Kaepernick went 15/29 for 193 yards and a touchdown pass. Frank Gore had 19 carries for 95 yards. With the win, the 49ers moved to 6–4 on the season.

==== Week 12: vs. Washington Redskins ====
Week Twelve: Washington Redskins at San Francisco 49ers – Game summary

Quarter	1	2	3	4	Total
Redskins	0	7	3	3	**13**
**49ers**	7	3	0	7	**17**

at Levi's Stadium, Santa Clara, California

- Date: November 23
- Game time: 1:25 pm. PST
- Game weather: 62 °F (17 °C), cloudy
- Game attendance: 70,799
- Referee: Walt Anderson
- TV announcers (CBS): Kevin Harlan and Rich Gannon
- Recap, Gamebook

Game information

**First quarter**

- SF – Anquan Boldin 30-yard pass from Colin Kaepernick, Phil Dawson kick, 11:13 (SF 7–0)

**Second quarter**

- WAS - Alfred Morris 1 yard run, Kai Forbath kick, 5:33 (TIE 7-7)
- SF - Phil Dawson 41-yard field goal, 0:00 (SF 10-7)

**Third quarter**

- WAS - Kai Forbath 27-yard field goal, 0:31 (TIE 10-10)

**Fourth quarter**

- WAS - Kai Forbath 46-yard field goal, 7:42 (WAS 13-10)
- SF – Carlos Hyde 4-yard run, Phil Dawson kick, 2:59 (SF 17–13)

**Top passers**

- WAS – Robert Griffin III, 11/19, 106 Yds
- SF – Colin Kaepernick, 20/29, 256 Yds, 1 TD, 1 Int

**Top rushers**

- WAS – Alfred Morris, 21 Car, 125 Yds, 1 TD
- SF – Frank Gore, 13 Car, 36 Yds

**Top receivers**

- WAS – Pierre Garçon, 3 Rec, 34 Yds; DeSean Jackson, 2 Rec, 39 Yds
- SF – Anquan Boldin, 9 Rec, 137 Yds, 1 TD

**Top tacklers**

- WAS – Keenan Robinson, 7 Solo, 3 Ast
- SF – Chris Borland, 6 Solo, 2 Ast

Carlos Hyde scored a rare fourth-quarter touchdown for the Niners, and allowed them to hold off the Redskins, 17–13.

==== Week 13: vs. Seattle Seahawks ====
Thanksgiving Day game

Week Thirteen: Seattle Seahawks at San Francisco 49ers – Game summary

Quarter	1	2	3	4	Total
**Seahawks**	7	6	3	3	**19**
49ers	0	0	3	0	**3**

at Levi's Stadium, Santa Clara, California

- Date: November 27
- Game time: 5:30 pm. PST
- Game weather: 68 °F (20 °C), clear
- Game attendance: 70,799
- Referee: Tony Corrente
- TV announcers (NBC): Al Michaels, Cris Collinsworth and Michele Tafoya
- Preview, Gamebook

Game information

**First quarter**

- SEA - Robert Turbin 13-yard pass from Russell Wilson, Steven Hauschka kick, 1:29 (SEA 7–0)

**Second quarter**

- SEA - Steven Hauschka 21-yard field goal, 11:07 (SEA 10-0)
- SEA - Steven Hauschka 36-yard field goal, 5:40 (SEA 13-0)

**Third quarter**

- SEA - Steven Hauschka 35-yard field goal, 8:05 (SEA 16-0)
- SF - Phil Dawson 40-yard field goal, 1:06 (SEA 16-3)

**Fourth quarter**

- SEA - Steven Hauschka 46-yard field goal, 10:11 (SEA 19-3)

**Top passers**

- SEA – Russell Wilson, 15/22, 236 Yds, 1 TD
- SF – Colin Kaepernick, 16/29, 121 Yds, 2 Ints

**Top rushers**

- SEA – Marshawn Lynch, 20 Car, 104 Yds
- SF – Frank Gore, 10 Car, 28 Yds

**Top receivers**

- SEA – Luke Willson, 4 Rec, 39 Yds
- SF – Carlos Hyde, 3 Rec, 38 Yds

**Top tacklers**

- SEA – Bobby Wagner, 9 Solo, 1 Ast
- SF – Chris Borland, 16 Solo

The Thanksgiving night matchup against Seattle on national television resulted in a Seahawks win. While the defense held Seattle to a touchdown and four field goals, the Niners only managed 164 yards of offense and one third-quarter field goal. The offense, which traditionally collapsed this season in the face of second-half adjustments, never got on track at all, averaging 3.2 yards per pass and 3.6 yards per rush. Two Colin Kaepernick interceptions and a Perrish Cox fumble were the difference in the game. After the game, 49ers owner Jed York apologized to fans on Twitter for his team's poor performance.

==== Week 14: at Oakland Raiders ====
Week Fourteen: San Francisco 49ers at Oakland Raiders – Game summary

Quarter	1	2	3	4	Total
49ers	7	3	3	0	**13**
**Raiders**	3	7	7	7	**24**

at O.co Coliseum, Oakland, California

- Date: December 7
- Game time: 1:25 pm. PST
- Game weather: 63 °F (17 °C), overcast
- Game attendance: 55,300
- Referee: Terry McAulay
- TV announcers (Fox): Chris Myers, Ronde Barber and Jennifer Hale
- Recap, Gamebook

Game information

**First quarter**

- OAK - Sebastian Janikowski 57-yard field goal, 11:46 (OAK 3–0)
- SF – Bruce Miller 8-yard pass from Colin Kaepernick, Phil Dawson kick, 1:54 (SF 7–3)

**Second quarter**

- OAK - Donald Penn 3-yard pass from Derek Carr, Sebastian Janikowski kick, 10:45 (OAK 10–7)
- SF - Phil Dawson 52-yard field goal, 0:01 (TIE 10–10)

**Third quarter**

- SF - Phil Dawson 20-yard field goal, 8:34 (SF 13–10)
- OAK - Marcel Reece 9-yard pass from Derek Carr, Sebastian Janikowski kick, 4:09 (OAK 17–13)

**Fourth quarter**

- OAK - Mychal Rivera 5-yard pass from Derek Carr, Sebastian Janikowski kick, 10:39 (OAK 24–13)

**Top passers**

- SF – Colin Kaepernick, 18/33, 174 Yds, 1 TD, 2 Ints
- OAK – Derek Carr, 22/28, 254 Yds, 3 TDs

**Top rushers**

- SF – Frank Gore, 12 Car, 63 Yds
- OAK – Latavius Murray, 23 Car, 76 Yds

**Top receivers**

- SF – Michael Crabtree, 9 Rec, 56 Yds
- OAK – Marcel Reece, 7 Rec, 109 Yds, 1 TD; Mychal Rivera, 7 Rec, 64 Yds, 1 TD

**Top tacklers**

- SF – Chris Borland - 12 Solo, 2 Ast
- OAK – Charles Woodson, 7 Solo, 1 Ast, 1 Int, 1 PD

The Niners were defeated by local rival Oakland. One of the league's worst defenses dominated the Niner offense. The Niners went into halftime tied at 10 after a 52-yard field goal by Phil Dawson with one second remaining, and briefly led, 13–10 in the third quarter on another Dawson kick. Consecutive 80-yard touchdown drives in the second half by the Raiders condemned the Niners to defeat.

==== Week 15: at Seattle Seahawks ====
Week Fifteen: San Francisco 49ers at Seattle Seahawks – Game summary

Quarter	1	2	3	4	Total
49ers	0	7	0	0	**7**
**Seahawks**	3	0	7	7	**17**

at CenturyLink Field, Seattle, Washington

- Date: December 14
- Game time: 1:25 pm. PST
- Game weather: 46 °F (8 °C), sunny
- Game attendance: 68,526
- Referee: Ed Hochuli
- TV announcers (Fox): Joe Buck, Troy Aikman and Erin Andrews
- Recap, Gamebook

Game information

**First quarter**

- SEA - Steven Hauschka 38-yard field goal, 3:40 (SEA 3-0)

**Second quarter**

- SF - Frank Gore 10-yard run, Phil Dawson kick, 13:22 (SF 7-3)

**Third quarter**

- SEA - Marshawn Lynch 4-yard run, Steven Hauschka kick, 2:19 (SEA 10-7)

**Fourth quarter**

- SEA - Paul Richardson 10-yard pass from Russell Wilson, Steven Hauschka kick, 13:20 (SEA 17-7)

**Top passers**

- SF – Colin Kaepernick, 11/19, 141 Yds
- SEA – Russell Wilson, 12/24, 168 Yds, 1 TD, 1 Int

**Top rushers**

- SF – Carlos Hyde, 6 Car, 55 Yds; Frank Gore 11 Car, 29 Yds, 1 TD
- SEA – Marshawn Lynch, 21 Car, 91 Yds, 1 TD

**Top receivers**

- SF – Bruce Miller, 4 Rec, 56 Yds
- SEA – Jermaine Kearse, 5 Rec, 78 Yds; Paul Richardson, 3 Rec, 30 Yds, 1 TD

**Top tacklers**

- SF – Chris Borland, 3 Solo, 3 Ast
- SEA – Bobby Wagner, 9 Solo, 1 Ast, 1 Sack

For the first time in the Jim Harbaugh era, the 49ers lost their third consecutive game. The Niners were several point underdogs in this game, but managed to stay competitive throughout thanks to their defense. They sacked Russell Wilson five times, intercepted him once and held him to just 168 passing yards, while pressuring him throughout the game. But despite a second-quarter touchdown by Frank Gore that gave them the lead at halftime, the offense was ineffective, and could not find a rhythm. This was the seventh time in the last eight games the 49ers offense failed to score at least 20 points. Since week 7, the 49ers were last in the league in scoring (13.7 points per game). With this loss the 49ers were eliminated from playoff contention.

==== Week 16: vs. San Diego Chargers ====
Week Sixteen: San Diego Chargers at San Francisco 49ers – Game summary

Quarter	1	2	3	4	OT	Total
**Chargers**	0	7	14	14	3	**38**
49ers	7	21	7	0	0	**35**

at Levi's Stadium, Santa Clara, California

- Date: December 20
- Game time: 5:25 pm. PST
- Game weather: 61 °F (16 °C), cloudy
- Game attendance: 70,699
- Referee: Jeff Triplette
- TV announcers (CBS/NFLN): Ian Eagle, Dan Fouts and Jenny Dell
- Recap, Gamebook

Game information

**First quarter**

- SF – Frank Gore 52-yard run, Phil Dawson kick, 13:12 (SF 7–0)

**Second quarter**

- SF - Bruce Ellington 8-yard pass from Colin Kaepernick, Phil Dawson kick, 13:36 (SF 14–0)
- SF – Antoine Bethea 49-yard interception return, Phil Dawson kick, 10:20 (SF 21–0)
- SD - Eddie Royal 15-yard pass from Philip Rivers, Nick Novak kick, 5:09 (SF 21–7)
- SF - Bruce Ellington 1 yard run, Phil Dawson kick, 0:06 (SF 28–7)

**Third quarter**

- SD - Antonio Gates 1 yard pass from Philip Rivers, Nick Novak kick, 5:49 (SF 28–14)
- SD – Corey Liuget recovered fumble in end zone, Nick Novak kick, 3:26 (SF 28–21)
- SF – Colin Kaepernick 90-yard run, Phil Dawson kick, 2:26 (SF 35–21)

**Fourth quarter**

- SD - Antonio Gates 21-yard pass from Philip Rivers, Nick Novak kick, 5:15 (SF 35–28)
- SD - Malcom Floyd 11-yard pass from Philip Rivers, Nick Novak kick, 0:29 (TIE 35–35)

**Overtime**

- SD - Nick Novak 40-yard field goal, 4:00 (SD 38–35)

**Top passers**

- SD – Philip Rivers, 33/54, 356 yds, 4 TDs, 3 Ints
- SF – Colin Kaepernick, 15/24, 114 Yds, 1 TD

**Top rushers**

- SD – Branden Oliver, 13 Car, 53 Yds
- SF – Frank Gore, 26 Car, 158 Yds, 1 TD; Colin Kaepernick, 7 Car, 151 Yds, 1 TD

**Top receivers**

- SD – Eddie Royal, 10 Rec, 94 Yds, 1 TD; Antonio Gates, 7 Rec, 92 Yds, 2 TDs
- SF – Anquan Boldin, 7 Rec, 61 Yds

**Top tacklers**

- SD – Manti Te'o, 8 Solo, 3 Ast, 1 sack
- SF – Michael Wilhoite, 8 Solo, 1 Ast; Antoine Bethea, 7 Solo, 1 Ast, 2 PDs, 1 Int, 1 TD

The 49ers dominated the first half and led 28–7 at halftime. However, their second-half offense stalled while the defense fell apart as the 49ers squandered a 21-point 3rd-quarter lead and a 14-point lead in the final minutes of the 4th quarter. The Chargers outscored the 49ers 31–7 after halftime. Trailing 35–28, the Chargers drove down the field for the game-tying touchdown, converting two 4th downs on that drive. The 49ers attempted to win in the final seconds of regulation, but Phil Dawson's 60-yard kick was way off. The game went to overtime. The 49ers got the ball first, but a fumble by Quinton Patton allowed the Chargers to have possession on their own 40. The Chargers drove to the 49ers' 22-yard line before kicking a field goal to hand the 49ers their fourth straight loss. The 49ers rushed for an astonishing 355 yards, including a 52-yard touchdown run by Frank Gore and a 90-yard touchdown run by Colin Kaepernick. The 49ers set an NFL record for most rushing yards in a loss The 49ers also scored 35 points, a season high. However, their offensive struggles in the second half of games continued. During the four-game losing streak, the 49ers scored only 13 points in the second half of their games (outscored 65–13 by opponents in the second half of those games). With the loss the 49ers fell to 7–8, ensuring that they would finish without a winning record for the first time since the 2010 season.

==== Week 17: vs. Arizona Cardinals ====
Week Seventeen: Arizona Cardinals at San Francisco 49ers – Game summary

Quarter	1	2	3	4	Total
Cardinals	7	10	0	0	**17**
**49ers**	7	6	7	0	**20**

at Levi's Stadium, Santa Clara, California

- Date: December 28
- Game time: 1:25 pm. PST
- Game weather: 51 °F (11 °C), sunny
- Game attendance: 70,699
- Referee: Carl Cheffers
- TV announcers (Fox): Thom Brennaman, David Diehl and Laura Okmin
- Recap, Gamebook

Game information

**First quarter**

- ARI – Michael Floyd 20-yard pass from Ryan Lindley, Chandler Catanzaro kick, 10:55 (ARI 7–0)
- SF – Anquan Boldin 76-yard pass from Colin Kaepernick, Phil Dawson kick, 9:24 (TIE 7–7)

**Second quarter**

- SF – Phil Dawson 53-yard field goal, 12:33 (SF 10–7)
- SF – Phil Dawson 37-yard field goal, 6:04 (SF 13–7)
- ARI – Chandler Catanzaro 36-yard field goal, 1:35 (SF 13–10)
- ARI – Michael Floyd 41-yard pass from Ryan Lindley, Chandler Catanzaro kick, 0:36 (ARI 17–13)

**Third quarter**

- SF – Bruce Miller 3-yard pass from Colin Kaepernick, Phil Dawson kick, 0:25 (SF 20–17)

**Fourth quarter**

- No scoring plays

**Top passers**

- ARI – Ryan Lindley, 23/39, 316 Yds, 2 TDs, 3 Ints
- SF – Colin Kaepernick, 15/26, 204 Yds, 2 TDs

**Top rushers**

- ARI – Kerwynn Williams, 17 Car, 67 Yds
- SF – Frank Gore, 25 Car, 144 Yds

**Top receivers**

- ARI – Michael Floyd, 8 Rec, 153 Yds, 2 TDs
- SF – Anquan Boldin, 2 Rec, 81 Yds, 1 TD; Michael Crabtree, 4 Rec, 41 Yds

**Top tacklers**

- ARI – Glenn Carson, 6 Solo, 3 Ast
- SF – Craig Dahl, 10 Solo, 1 Int, 1 PD

A strong defensive showing overcame the usual second-half collapse by the offense, and the Niners held on for a 20–17 win, to even their season record at 8–8. The 49ers defense intercepted Cardinals QB Ryan Lindley three times and sacked him twice, shutting Arizona out in the second half. Phil Dawson kicked two field goals, and Bruce Miller caught a three-yard touchdown pass in the third quarter for the margin of victory. Frank Gore, who needed just 38 yards to reach 1,000 rushing yards on the year, rushed for 144 yards on 25 carries. It was the eighth time in his career that he rushed for 1,000 yards in a season. 49ers wideout Anquan Boldin caught a 76-yard touchdown pass, giving him over 1,000 yards receiving for the year. This was the last game coached by 49ers head coach Jim Harbaugh, as he and the 49ers front office mutually agreed to cut ties after the game.

== Standings ==
=== Division ===
NFC West
	W	L	T	PCT	DIV	CONF	PF	PA	STK
^{(1)} Seattle Seahawks	12	4	0	.750	5–1	10–2	394	254	W6
^{(5)} Arizona Cardinals	11	5	0	.688	3–3	8–4	310	299	L2
San Francisco 49ers	8	8	0	.500	2–4	7–5	306	340	W1
St. Louis Rams	6	10	0	.375	2–4	4–8	324	354	L3

=== Conference ===
NFC
#	Team	Division	W	L	T	PCT	DIV	CONF	SOS	SOV	STK
Division leaders
1 (Note: Seattle, Green Bay and Dallas were ranked in seeds 1–3 based on conference record.)	Seattle Seahawks	West	12	4	0	.750	5–1	10–2	.525	.513	W6
2	Green Bay Packers	North	12	4	0	.750	5–1	9–3	.482	.440	W2
3	Dallas Cowboys	East	12	4	0	.750	4–2	8–4	.445	.422	W4
4	Carolina Panthers	South	7	8	1	.469	4–2	6–6	.490	.357	W4
Wild Cards
5 (Note: Arizona defeated Detroit head-to-head (Week 11, 14–6).)	Arizona Cardinals	West	11	5	0	.688	3–3	8–4	.523	.477	L2
6	Detroit Lions	North	11	5	0	.688	5–1	9–3	.471	.392	L1
Did not qualify for the postseason
7	Philadelphia Eagles	East	10	6	0	.625	4–2	6–6	.490	.416	W1
8	San Francisco 49ers	West	8	8	0	.500	2–4	7–5	.527	.508	W1
9 (Note: New Orleans defeated Minnesota head-to-head (Week 3, 20–9).)	New Orleans Saints	South	7	9	0	.438	3–3	6–6	.486	.415	W1
10	Minnesota Vikings	North	7	9	0	.438	1–5	6–6	.475	.308	W1
11 (Note: The NY Giants defeated both Atlanta and St. Louis head-to-head (Atlanta: Week 5, 30–20; St. Louis: Week 16, 37–27), while Atlanta finished ahead of St. Louis based on conference record.)	New York Giants	East	6	10	0	.375	2–4	4–8	.512	.323	L1
12	Atlanta Falcons	South	6	10	0	.375	5–1	6–6	.482	.380	L1
13	St. Louis Rams	West	6	10	0	.375	2–4	4–8	.531	.427	L3
14	Chicago Bears	North	5	11	0	.313	1–5	4–8	.529	.338	L5
15	Washington Redskins	East	4	12	0	.250	2–4	2–10	.496	.422	L1
16	Tampa Bay Buccaneers	South	2	14	0	.125	0–6	1–11	.486	.469	L6
Tiebreakers (Note: When breaking ties for three or more teams under the NFL's rules, they are first broken within divisions, then comparing only the highest-ranked remaining team from each division.)

== Levi's Stadium parking issues ==
In November 2013, Levi's Stadium and 49ers officials initially requested the NFL not to schedule any weekday home games during the preseason or regular season – including Monday and Thursday Night Football – during Levi's Stadium's inaugural season, due to parking issues in the Santa Clara area during weekdays. Two months later (January 2014), the Santa Clara City Council approved a two-year deal with the Santa Clara Golf & Tennis Club that would have opened up 10,000 additional parking spaces within walking distance of Levi's Stadium, as well as reimbursed the club $250,000 for each year, enabling the team to host Monday and Thursday night games for both the 2014 and 2015 seasons. However, the NFL decided not to schedule any weeknight prime-time games at Levi's Stadium during the 2014 season, with the exception of the Week 13 Thanksgiving game, until traffic flow within the area was figured out.
