= Rashard Robinson =

American football player (born 1995)

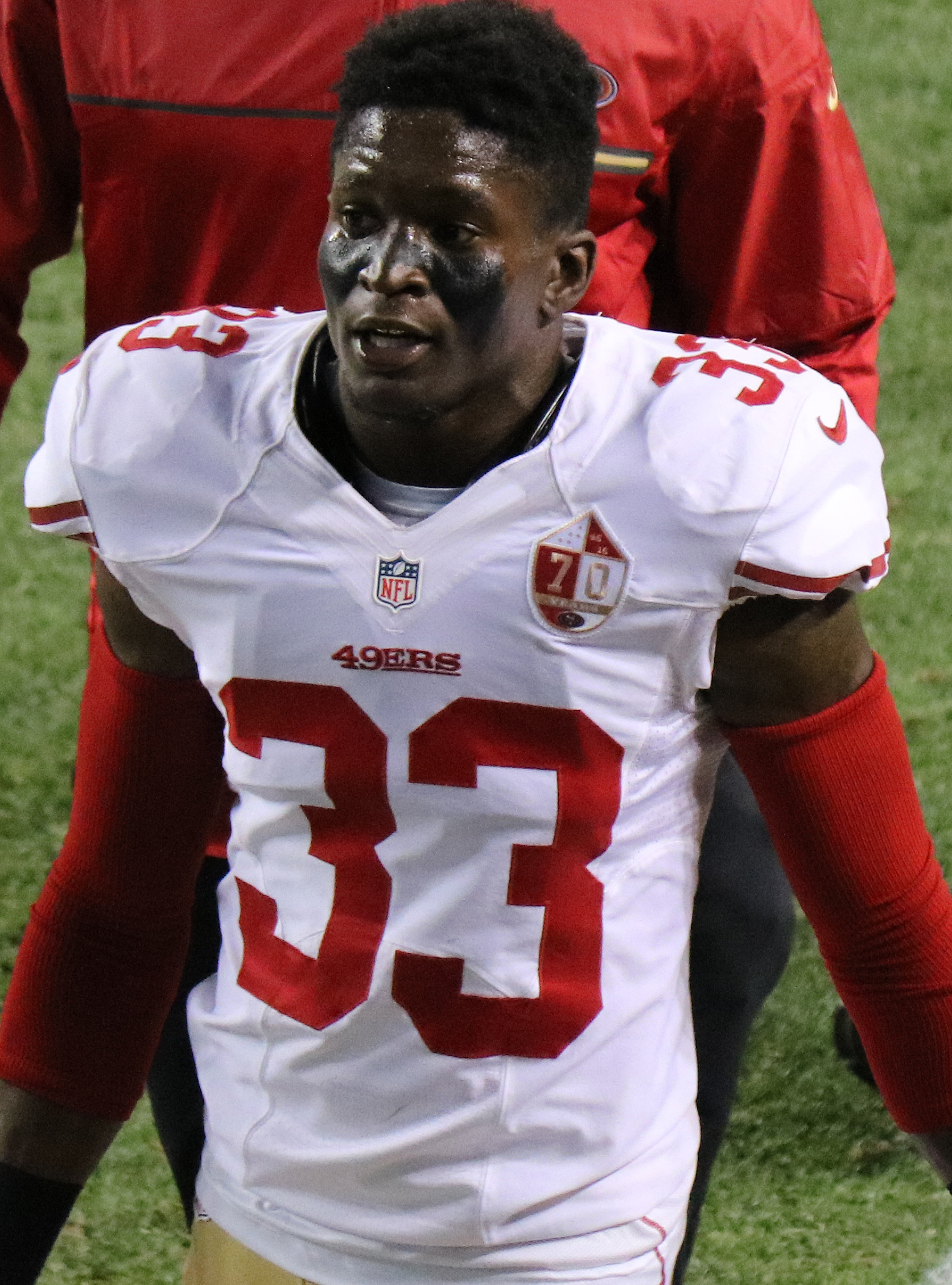
- Robinson with the San Francisco 49ers in 2016

Profile
- Position: Cornerback

Personal information
- Born: July 23, 1995 (age 31); Pompano Beach, Florida, U.S.
- Listed height: 6 ft 2 in (1.88 m)
- Listed weight: 177 lb (80 kg)

Career information
- High school: Blanche Ely (Pompano Beach)
- College: LSU
- NFL draft: 2016: 4th round, 133rd overall pick

Career history
- San Francisco 49ers (2016–2017); New York Jets (2017–2018); Dallas Cowboys (2020); Tampa Bay Buccaneers (2021); Saskatchewan Roughriders (2023)*
- * Offseason or practice squad member only

Career NFL statistics
- Total tackles: 89
- Forced fumbles: 1
- Fumble recoveries: 2
- Pass deflections: 15
- Interceptions: 2
- Stats at Pro Football Reference

Rashard Robinson (born July 23, 1995) is an American professional football cornerback. He played college football at LSU, and was selected by the San Francisco 49ers in the fourth round of the 2016 NFL draft. Robinson has also been a member of the New York Jets, Dallas Cowboys, and Tampa Bay Buccaneers.

== Early life ==
Robinson was born in Pompano Beach, Florida, where he attended Blanche Ely High School.

== College career ==
Robinson attended Louisiana State University, where he played two seasons of college football for the LSU Tigers under head coach Les Miles. Robinson recorded one interception and 30 tackles in 15 games.

Robinson was suspended indefinitely from LSU's football team midway through the 2014 season due to a failed drug test and substandard academics. After missing a semester, he was arrested in June 2015 for unauthorized entry into a teammate's apartment and was not allowed to re-enroll. Robinson returned to Florida and enrolled at Broward College in Fort Lauderdale, where he began training for the NFL draft.

== Professional career ==
=== Pre-draft ===
Coming out of LSU, Robinson was by the majority of NFL draft experts and scouts to be a fourth or fifth round pick. He received an invitation to the NFL Combine and boasted that he would run a 4.2 40-yard dash. Robinson's performance was sub-par, and he elected to skip the bench press and was unable to complete the short shuttle or three-cone drill after suffering a calf injury. On March 14, 2016, Robinson attended LSU's Pro Day, but held a private workout afterwards due to his tumultuous past with the team. All 32 NFL teams were in attendance as Robinson opted to complete all of the combine and positional drills. He was able to shorten his times in the 40 (4.40), 20 (2.61), and 10-yard dash (1.60) from the combine. Robinson was ranked as the 16th best cornerback prospect in the draft by NFLDraftScout.com. NFL analysts and scouts cited his thin frame, off the field problems, spindly legs, and character concerns were cited as his top issues. Robinson was considered to be one of the top press corners in the draft and was described in scouting reports as a player with a long frame and great man coverage ability. He also has blazing straight line speed and explosiveness.

Pre-draft measurables
Height	Weight	Arm length	Hand span	40-yard dash	10-yard split	20-yard split	20-yard shuttle	Three-cone drill	Vertical jump	Broad jump	Bench press
6 ft 1 1/2 in (1.87 m)	171 lb (78 kg)	32 1/4 in (0.82 m)	9 in (0.23 m)	4.40 s	1.60 s	2.61 s	4.50 s	7.29 s	35.5 in (0.90 m)	10 ft 1 in (3.07 m)	5 reps
All values from NFL Combine/LSU's Pro Day

=== San Francisco 49ers ===
==== 2016 ====
The San Francisco 49ers selected Robinson in the fourth round (133rd overall) of the 2016 NFL draft. He was one of three cornerbacks the 49ers selected in the 2016 NFL Draft, along with Will Redmond (third round) and Prince Charles Iworah (seventh round). On May 6, 2016, the 49ers signed Robinson to a four-year, $2.72 million contract with a signing bonus of $383,393.

Robinson competed with Kenneth Acker, Keith Reaser, Dontae Johnson, Marcus Cromartie, Chris Davis, Will Redmond, and Prince Charles Iworah throughout training camp for a role as the backup cornerback. Head coach Chip Kelly named him the fifth cornerback on the depth chart to begin the season, behind Tramaine Brock, Jimmie Ward, Davis, and Johnson.

Robinson made his professional regular season debut during the 49ers' season-opening 28–0 victory over the Los Angeles Rams on Monday Night Football. In the next game against the Carolina Panthers, Robinson made his first career tackle during the 46–27 road loss. Two weeks later against the Dallas Cowboys, Robinson earned the first start of his career in place of Jimmie Ward, who suffered a quad injury during a special teams play the week prior against the Seattle Seahawks. Robinson finished the 24–17 loss with five solo tackles and a season-high three pass deflections in his first start.

During Week 6 against the Buffalo Bills, Robinson made his third start and tied his season-high of five solo tackles before leaving the eventual 45–16 road loss in the third quarter with a concussion. He was forced to miss Weeks 9 and 10 after suffering an MCL sprain. During Week 16 against the Rams, Robinson recorded a solo tackle, deflected two passes, and his first interception of his career off of Jared Goff to seal a narrow 22–21 road victory for the 49ers.

Robinson finished his rookie year with 28 tackles, eight pass deflections, and an interception in 14 games and six starts.

==== 2017 ====
Robinson entered training camp competing for one of the vacant starting cornerback jobs after Jimmie Ward was moved to free safety and Tramaine Brock was released following a domestic violence incident. Robinson competed with Dontae Johnson, Keith Reaser, Ahkello Witherspoon, and K'Waun Williams throughout training camp. Head coach Kyle Shanahan named him the starting cornerback opposite Dontae Johnson to begin the 2017 season.

Robinson started the 49ers' season-opener against the Panthers and recorded four combined tackles and recovered a fumble after forcing it from Christian McCaffrey in the fourth quarter of the 23–3 loss. Three weeks later against the Arizona Cardinals, he recorded a season-high six solo tackles and a season-high four pass deflections in the 18–15 road loss. During Week 6 against the Washington Redskins, Robinson recorded two combined tackles, a pass deflection, and an interception off of Kirk Cousins in the narrow 26–24 road loss.

=== New York Jets ===
On October 31, 2017, Robinson was traded to the New York Jets in exchange for a fifth-round pick in the 2018 NFL draft. The Jets traded for Robinson to provide depth to a cornerback corps after Buster Skrine suffered a concussion, Morris Claiborne was unable to practice due to a foot injury, and Xavier Coleman was placed on injured/reserve for the remainder of the season with a shoulder injury.

On July 25, 2018, Robinson was suspended the first four games of 2018 for violating the NFL Policy and Program for Substances of Abuse.

On May 10, 2019, Robinson was released by the Jets. On July 17, he was suspended for the first 10 weeks of the 2019 NFL season for violating the league's substance abuse policy. Robinson was reinstated from suspension on March 19, 2020.

=== Dallas Cowboys ===
On September 15, 2020, Robinson was signed to the practice squad of the Dallas Cowboys. He was placed on the practice squad/injured list on October 24, and restored to the practice squad on November 18. Robinson was elevated to the active roster on November 21 and November 26 for the team's Weeks 11 and 12 games against the Minnesota Vikings and Washington Football Team and was reverted to the practice squad after each game. He was promoted to the active roster on December 7.

On April 20, 2021, Robinson was suspended by the NFL for the first two games of the 2021 season for violating the league's performance-enhancing drug policy. He was released by the Cowboys on July 17.

=== Tampa Bay Buccaneers ===
After serving his two-game suspension, Robinson signed with the Tampa Bay Buccaneers' practice squad on September 20, 2021. He was promoted to the active roster on October 19. Robinson was placed on injured reserve on November 12 after suffering a hamstring injury in practice. He was activated on December 24. Robinson was waived on January 15, 2022, and was re-signed to the practice squad. After the Buccaneers were eliminated in the Divisional Round, he signed a reserve/future contract on January 24.

On August 30, 2022, Robinson was placed on injured reserve. He was released three days later.

=== Saskatchewan Roughriders ===
On March 31, 2023, Robinson signed with the Saskatchewan Roughriders of the Canadian Football League (CFL). He was placed on the reserve/suspended list on May 14, and remained there until his contract expired on February 11, 2025.

== NFL career statistics ==
Legend
**Bold**	Career high

Year	Team	Games		Tackles				Interceptions						Fumbles			
Year	Team	GP	GS	Comb	Solo	Ast	Sck	PD	Int	Yds	Avg	Lng	TD	FF	FR	Yds	TD
2016	SF	14	6	**28**	**25**	3	0.0	**8**	**1**	0	0.0	0	0	0	0	0	0
2017	SF	8	7	27	20	**7**	0.0	7	**1**	0	0.0	0	0	**1**	**1**	**2**	0
2017	NYJ	6	1	2	2	0	0.0	0	0	0	0.0	0	0	0	**1**	0	0
2018	NYJ	10	1	8	7	1	0.0	0	0	0	0.0	0	0	0	0	0	0
2020	DAL	4	3	20	13	**7**	0.0	0	0	0	0.0	0	0	0	0	0	0
2021	TB	7	0	4	3	1	0.0	0	0	0	0.0	0	0	0	0	0	0
Career		49	18	89	70	19	0.0	15	2	0	0.0	0	0	1	2	2	0

== Legal troubles ==
Robinson was suspended indefinitely from LSU's football team midway through the 2014 season due to a failed drug test and substandard academics. After missing a semester, he was arrested in June 2015 for unauthorized entry into a teammate's apartment and was not allowed to re-enroll. Robinson returned to Florida and enrolled at Broward College in Fort Lauderdale, where he began training for the NFL Draft.

On January 10, 2018, Robinson was arrested for possessing marijuana-laced candy. On July 25, he was suspended for four games as a result of these prior arrests.
