= Dontae Johnson =

American football player (born 1991)

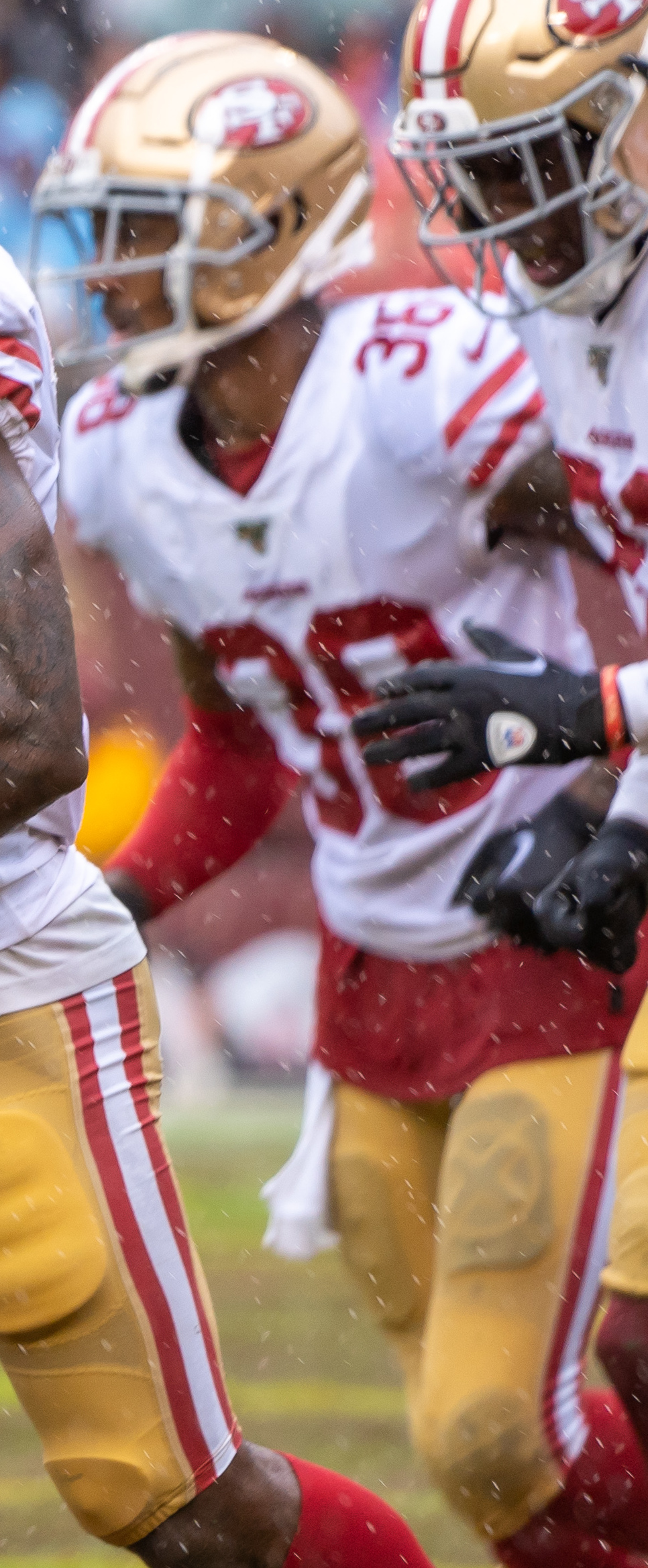
- Johnson with the San Francisco 49ers in 2019

No. 27, 29, 36, 38
- Position: Cornerback

Personal information
- Born: December 1, 1991 (age 34); Plainfield, New Jersey, U.S.
- Listed height: 6 ft 2 in (1.88 m)
- Listed weight: 200 lb (91 kg)

Career information
- High school: The Pennington School (Pennington, New Jersey)
- College: NC State (2010–2013)
- NFL draft: 2014: 4th round, 129th overall pick

Career history
- San Francisco 49ers (2014–2017); Seattle Seahawks (2018); Buffalo Bills (2018); Arizona Cardinals (2018); Kansas City Chiefs (2019)*; Los Angeles Chargers (2019); San Francisco 49ers (2019–2022)
- * Offseason or practice squad member only

Career NFL statistics
- Total tackles: 214
- Sacks: 1.0
- Pass deflections: 26
- Interceptions: 2
- Forced fumbles: 1
- Fumble recoveries: 4
- Defensive touchdowns: 2
- Stats at Pro Football Reference

Dontae Johnson (born December 1, 1991) is an American former professional football player who was a cornerback in the National Football League (NFL). He played college football for the NC State Wolfpack and was selected by the San Francisco 49ers in the fourth round of the 2014 NFL draft. He was also a member of the Seattle Seahawks, Buffalo Bills, Arizona Cardinals, Kansas City Chiefs, and Los Angeles Chargers.

== Early life ==
Johnson was born in Plainfield, New Jersey and grew up in South Plainfield, New Jersey. He attended South Plainfield High School his freshman year before transferring to The Pennington School. He was selected to the New Jersey all-prep first-team. He had 108 tackles, six interceptions along with three forced fumbles in his senior season. He also played AAU basketball in high school.

== College career ==
During his junior season, Johnson was selected ACC Defensive Back of the Week for his performance against Wake Forest on November 12, 2012. He was invited to the 2014 Senior Bowl as a member of the North team.

== Professional career ==
=== Pre-draft ===
Coming out of NC State, Johnson was projected by some NFL draft experts to be a third or fourth round pick, while others projected him to be selected in the fifth or sixth round. He received an invitation to the NFL Combine and completed all of the required combine and positional drills. On March 24, 2014, he chose to participate at NC State's pro day, but opted to only perform positional drills for NFL team representatives and scouts. Johnson was ranked the 25th best cornerback prospect in the draft by NFLDraftScout.com.

Pre-draft measurables
Height	Weight	Arm length	Hand span	40-yard dash	10-yard split	20-yard split	20-yard shuttle	Three-cone drill	Vertical jump	Broad jump	Bench press
6 ft 2 1/8 in (1.88 m)	200 lb (91 kg)	31 1/2 in (0.80 m)	8 5/8 in (0.22 m)	4.45 s	1.57 s	2.62 s	4.24 s	6.69 s	38 1/2 in (0.98 m)	10 ft 4 in (3.15 m)	12 reps
All values from NFL Combine

=== San Francisco 49ers (first stint) ===
==== 2014 season ====
The San Francisco 49ers selected Johnson in the fourth round (129th overall) of the 2014 NFL draft. He was the 16th cornerback selected in the draft.

On May 15, 2014, the 49ers signed Johnson to a four-year, $2.62 million contract that includes a signing bonus of $400,544.

He competed with Chris Culliver, Tramaine Brock, Perrish Cox, Chris Cook, Kenneth Acker, and Darryl Morris throughout training camp in 2014 for the job as the starting cornerback. Head coach Jim Harbaugh named Johnson the fifth cornerback on the depth chart, behind veterans Brock, Culliver, Cox, and Chris Cook.

He made his professional regular season debut in the 49ers' season-opener at the Dallas Cowboys and recorded two solo tackles and two pass deflections in their 28–17 victory. On October 13, 2014, Johnson made a tackle, a pass deflection, and made his first career interception after picking off a pass attempt by Austin Davis and returning it for a 20-yard touchdown during a 31–17 win over the St. Louis Rams. During a Week 14 matchup against the Oakland Raiders, Johnson collected a season-high seven combined tackles as the 49ers lost 24–13. On December 14, 2014, he earned his first career start and recorded four combined tackles and deflected a pass in a 17–7 loss at the Seattle Seahawks. He finished his rookie season with 34 combined tackles (26 solo), six pass deflections, an interception, and a touchdown in three starts and 16 games. The 49ers and Harbaugh mutually parted ways after they finished with an 8–8 season in 2014.

==== 2015 season ====
Johnson returned to training camp in 2015 to compete with Brock, Shareece Wright, Chris Cook, Leon McFadden, Acker, and Keith Reaser for the starting cornerback position. New head coach Jim Tomsula named Johnson the third cornerback on the 49ers depth chart behind Brock and Acker.

On November 8, 2015, Johnson received his first start of the season and recorded a season-high six solo tackles and two pass deflections during a 17–16 victory over the Atlanta Falcons. On January 3, 2016, he earned a season-high seven combined tackles and defended a pass in the 49ers' 19–16 defeat of the Rams. He finished the 2015 season with a total of 32 combined tackles (29 solo) and five pass deflections in three starts and 16 games. The 49ers opted to fire Tomsula after they finished with a 5–11 record in 2015.

==== 2016 season ====
Johnson competed with Brock, Jimmie Ward, Chris Davis, Acker, Keith Reaser, and Rashard Robinson through training camp for the starting cornerback position. Head coach Chip Kelly named Johnson the third cornerback on the 49ers' depth chart to begin the regular season.

During a Week 10 matchup against at the Arizona Cardinals, Johnson recorded a season-high three combined tackles in the 49ers' 23–20 loss. On January 1, 2017, he collected a season-high four combined tackles and a season-high two pass deflections, as the 49ers lost 25–23 to the Seahawks. His production fell under head coach Chip Kelly and defensive coordinator Jim O'Neil in 2016 and Johnson finished the season with 15 combined tackles (11 solo) and three pass deflections in 15 games and zero starts. The 49ers finished with a 2–14 record and ultimately fired their head coach Chip Kelly.

==== 2017 season ====
Johnson returned to 49ers' training camp in 2017 and competed with Rashard Robinson, Keith Reaser, Ahkello Witherspoon, and K'Waun Williams for the job as the starting cornerback. Head coach Kyle Shanahan named Johnson the starting cornerback, along with Robinson and Williams as nickelback, to begin the 2017 season.

He started the 49ers' season-opener against the Carolina Panthers and recorded two solo tackles in a 23–3 loss. On October 1, 2017, Johnson collected eight combined tackles and a season-high two pass deflections during a 18–15 loss at the Cardinals. The next week, he earned a career-high nine combined tackles as the 49ers lost to the Indianapolis Colts 26–23. On December 24, 2017, Johnson made his second career interception after picking off a pass attempt by Blake Bortles and returning it for a 50-yard touchdown during a 44–33 win over the Jacksonville Jaguars.

Johnson led the 49ers in tackles during the 2017 season, but despite this statistical output, he also struggled mightily in pass coverage, with Pro Football Focus giving him an overall grade of 36.9 on the season.

=== Seattle Seahawks ===
On April 11, 2018, Johnson signed with the Seahawks. He was projected to be one of the starting cornerbacks to start the season; however, he suffered a groin injury and was placed on injured reserve. On September 27, the Seahawks released Johnson from injured reserve.

=== Buffalo Bills ===
On October 2, 2018, Johnson signed with the Buffalo Bills. He was released on October 30, 2018.

=== Arizona Cardinals ===
On November 27, 2018, Johnson signed with the Cardinals. He was released on December 18, 2018.

=== Kansas City Chiefs ===
On February 22, 2019, Johnson was signed by the Kansas City Chiefs. He was released on May 20, 2019.

=== San Francisco 49ers (second stint) ===
On May 28, 2019, Johnson was signed by the 49ers. On August 19, 2019, he caught an interception in a preseason game. He was released during final roster cuts on August 30, 2019.

=== Los Angeles Chargers ===
On September 11, 2019, Johnson was signed by the Los Angeles Chargers. He was released on September 28, 2019.

=== San Francisco 49ers (third stint) ===
On October 3, 2019, Johnson was signed by the 49ers. He was released on November 11. He was re-signed on December 11, 2019. Johnson and the 49ers reached Super Bowl LIV, but lost 31–20 to the Kansas City Chiefs.

On April 13, 2020, Johnson re-signed with the 49ers. He was released on September 5, 2020, and signed to the practice squad the next day. He was elevated to the active roster on September 12 for the team's week 1 game against the Cardinals and reverted to the practice squad on September 14. He was promoted to the active roster on September 16, 2020. In Week 17 against the Seahawks, Johnson recorded his first career sack on Russell Wilson during the 26–23 loss.

On March 19, 2021, Johnson re-signed with the 49ers. He was released on September 6, 2021, and re-signed to the practice squad. He was signed to the active roster on September 14.

On March 24, 2022, Johnson re-signed with the 49ers. He was released on August 30, 2022, and re-signed to the practice squad. On December 11, he suffered a season-ending ACL injury.

== NFL career statistics ==
Legend
**Bold**	Career high

=== Regular season ===
Year	Team	Games		Tackles					Interceptions					Fumbles			
Year	Team	GP	GS	Cmb	Solo	Ast	Sck	TFL	Int	Yds	TD	Lng	PD	FF	FR	Yds	TD
2014	SFO	**16**	3	34	26	8	0.0	1	**1**	20	**1**	20	6	0	0	0	0
2015	SFO	**16**	3	32	29	3	0.0	0	0	0	0	0	5	0	**2**	0	0
2016	SFO	15	0	15	11	4	0.0	1	0	0	0	0	3	0	0	0	0
2017	SFO	**16**	**16**	**77**	**69**	8	0.0	**2**	**1**	**50**	**1**	**50**	**7**	0	0	0	0
2018	BUF	1	0	0	0	0	0.0	0	0	0	0	0	0	0	0	0	0
2019	LAC	2	0	0	0	0	0.0	0	0	0	0	0	0	0	0	0	0
2019	SFO	7	0	3	3	0	0.0	0	0	0	0	0	0	0	0	0	0
2020	SFO	14	3	23	17	6	**1.0**	1	0	0	0	0	3	0	0	0	0
2021	SFO	**16**	3	30	20	**10**	0.0	0	0	0	0	0	2	**1**	**2**	0	0
2022	SFO	2	0	0	0	0	0.0	0	0	0	0	0	0	0	0	0	0
		105	28	214	175	39	1.0	5	2	70	2	50	26	1	4	0	0

=== Playoffs ===
Year	Team	Games		Tackles					Interceptions					Fumbles			
Year	Team	GP	GS	Cmb	Solo	Ast	Sck	TFL	Int	Yds	TD	Lng	PD	FF	FR	Yds	TD
2021	SFO	**3**	**1**	**6**	**5**	**1**	0.0	0	0	0	0	0	0	0	0	0	0
		3	1	6	5	1	0.0	0	0	0	0	0	0	0	0	0	0
