= Ahkello Witherspoon =

American football player (born 1995)

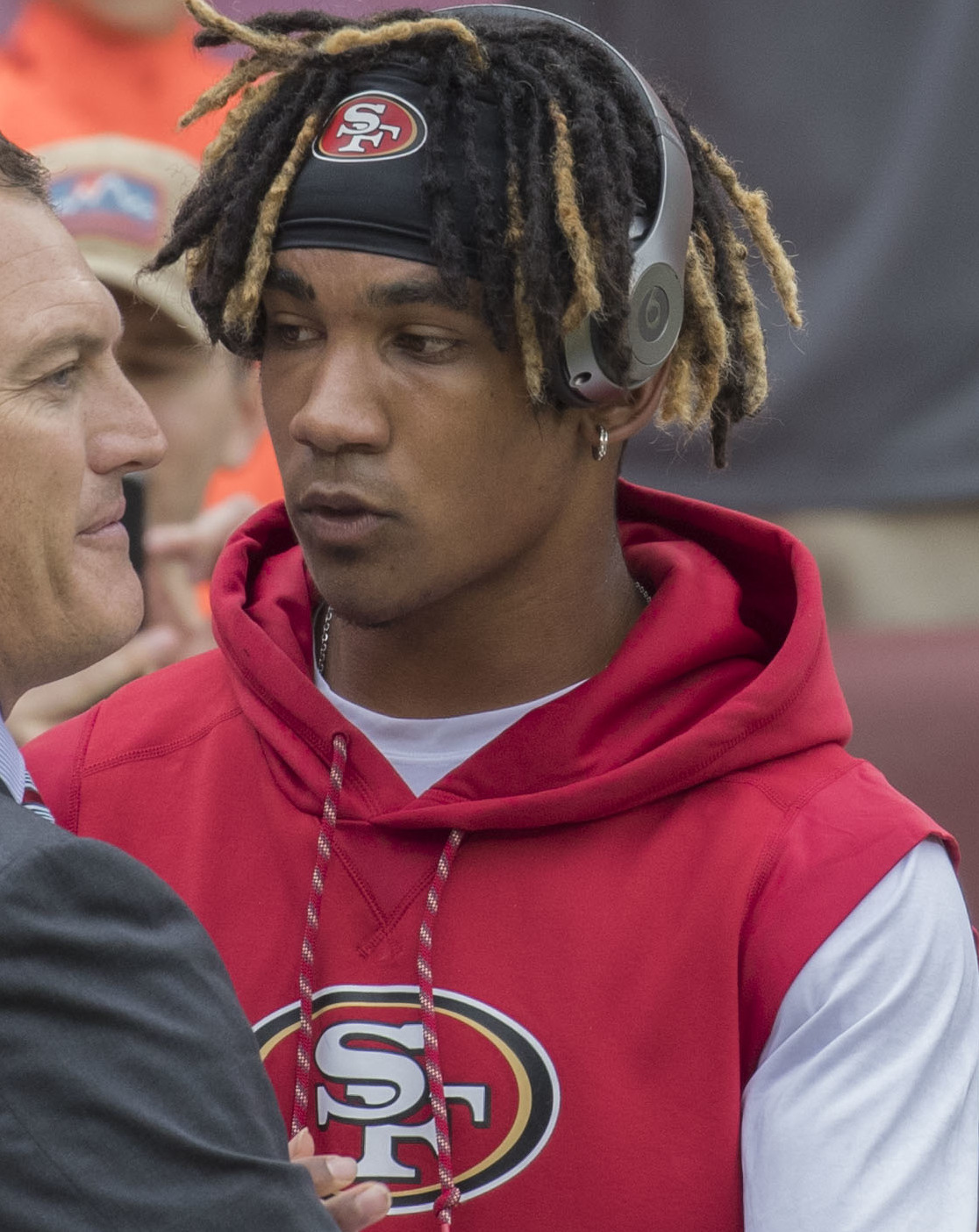
- Witherspoon with the San Francisco 49ers in 2017

No. 23, 25, 44
- Position: Cornerback

Personal information
- Born: March 21, 1995 (age 31); Sacramento, California, U.S.
- Listed height: 6 ft 2 in (1.88 m)
- Listed weight: 195 lb (88 kg)

Career information
- High school: Christian Brothers (Sacramento)
- College: Sacramento City (2013); Colorado (2014–2016)
- NFL draft: 2017: 3rd round, 66th overall pick

Career history
- San Francisco 49ers (2017–2020); Seattle Seahawks (2021)*; Pittsburgh Steelers (2021–2022); Los Angeles Rams (2023–2025); Washington Commanders (2026)*
- * Offseason or practice squad member only

Awards and highlights
- Second-team All-Pac-12 (2016)

Career NFL statistics
- Tackles: 243
- Forced fumbles: 1
- Fumble recoveries: 3
- Pass deflections: 60
- Interceptions: 13
- Touchdowns: 1
- Stats at Pro Football Reference

Ahkello Witherspoon (born March 21, 1995) is an American former professional football player who was a cornerback in the National Football League (NFL). Witherspoon played college football for the Sacramento City Panthers and Colorado Buffaloes and was selected by the San Francisco 49ers in the third round of the 2017 NFL draft. He was also a member of the Seattle Seahawks, Pittsburgh Steelers, Los Angeles Rams, and Washington Commanders.

== Early life ==
Witherspoon attended Christian Brothers High School in Sacramento, California. He played only one season of football in high school.

== College career ==
Witherspoon played at Sacramento City College for one year before transferring to the University of Colorado Boulder. He played at Colorado from 2014 to 2016. During his career, Witherspoon had 71 tackles and three interceptions.

== Professional career ==
=== Pre-draft ===
Coming out of Colorado, Witherspoon was projected to be a second or third round pick by most NFL draft experts and scouts. He received an invitation to the NFL Combine and performed nearly every combine drill, but opted to skip the bench press. On March 8, 2017, Witherspoon chose to participate at Colorado's pro day along with, Chidobe Awuzie, Tedric Thompson, Sefo Liufau, and ten other prospects. All 32 NFL teams had team representatives and scouts present. He had five private workouts and visits with the Indianapolis Colts, New Orleans Saints, Philadelphia Eagles, San Francisco 49ers, and Seattle Seahawks. Witherspoon was ranked the 14th best cornerback prospect in the draft by NFLDraftScout.com.

Pre-draft measurables
Height	Weight	Arm length	Hand span	Wingspan	40-yard dash	10-yard split	20-yard split	20-yard shuttle	Three-cone drill	Vertical jump	Broad jump
6 ft 2 3/4 in (1.90 m)	198 lb (90 kg)	33 in (0.84 m)	9 7/8 in (0.25 m)	6 ft 7 3/8 in (2.02 m)	4.45 s	1.51 s	2.57 s	4.13 s	6.93 s	40.5 in (1.03 m)	10 ft 7 in (3.23 m)
All values from NFL Combine

=== San Francisco 49ers ===
==== 2017 ====
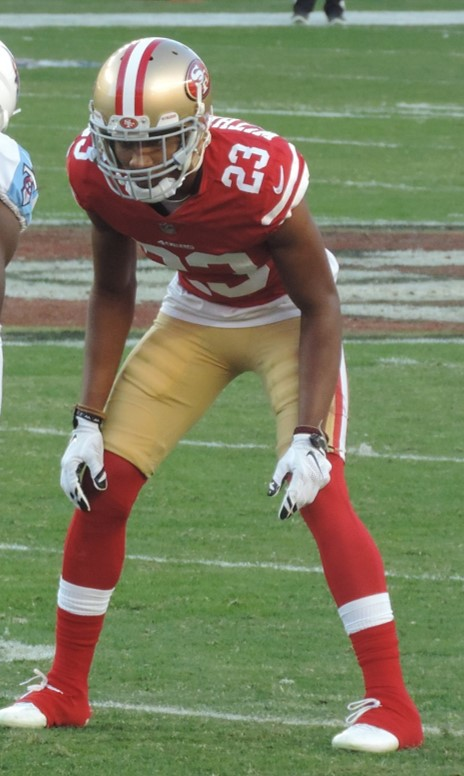
Witherspoon in 2017

The 49ers selected Witherspoon in the third round (66th overall) of the 2017 NFL draft. He was the 11th cornerback selected in the draft.

On May 12, 2017, the 49ers signed Witherspoon to a four-year, $3.88 million contract that included an initial signing bonus of $973,572.

Throughout training camp, Witherspoon competed against Dontae Johnson, Rashard Robinson, and Keith Reaser to earn a role as a starting cornerback following the departure of Jimmie Ward. Head coach Kyle Shanahan named Witherspoon a backup cornerback to begin the season and listed him as the fifth cornerback on the depth chart, behind Johnson, Robinson, K'Waun Williams, and Reaser.

Witherspoon was inactive as a healthy scratch for the first four games (Weeks 1–4) of the season. On September 16, 2017, the 49ers released Reaser, but opted to sign Asa Jackson to the active roster with Witherspoon remaining inactive. Heading into Week 5, he had surpassed Asa Jackson on the depth chart and was promoted to the fourth cornerback on the depth chart. On October 8, 2017, Witherspoon made his professional regular season debut, but was limited to a solo tackle during a 26–23 overtime road loss to the Indianapolis Colts.

Entering Week 8, defensive coordinator Robert Saleh promoted Witherspoon to the starting cornerback after Rashard Robinson was benched following disappointing performances and repetitive penalties. Witherspoon earned his first career start in Week 8 against the Philadelphia Eagles, recording three solo tackles, a pass deflection, and his first career interception on a pass attempt thrown by Carson Wentz to wide receiver Mack Hollins during the 33–10 road loss. Pro Football Focus graded Witherspoon the best player on the 49ers during the matchup against the Eagles and credited him with allowing three receptions on eight targets. Two days later, the 49ers traded Robinson to the New York Jets. Head coach Kyle Shanahan stated that Witherspoon would be the starting cornerback, opposite Dontae Johnson, moving forward and his development was one of the key factors in their decision to trade Robinson. He surpassed Leon Hall, Greg Mabin, and K'Waun Williams on the depth chart. During Week 16 against the Jacksonville Jaguars, Witherspoon had three combined tackles (two solo), set a season-high with two pass deflections, and also intercepted a pass by Blake Bortles to wide receiver Keelan Cole in the 44–33 victory. In the regular season finale against the Los Angeles Rams, Witherspoon collected a season-high tying four solo tackles and a pass deflection during the 34–13 road victory.

Witherspoon finished his rookie year with 32 combined tackles (28 solo), seven pass deflections, and two interceptions in 12 games and nine starts.

==== 2018 ====
Throughout training camp, Witherspoon competed against K'Waun Williams, Jimmie Ward, D. J. Reed, Emmanuel Moseley, Tarvarius Moore, and Tarvarus McFadden to be the No. 2 starting cornerback. Head coach Kyle Shanahan named him and Richard Sherman the starting cornerbacks to begin the regular season.

During a Week 3 38–27 road loss to the Kansas City Chiefs, Witherspoon collected a season-high five solo tackles. During Week 15 against the Seattle Seahawks, he had a solo tackle before leaving the eventual 26–23 overtime victory in the third quarter with a knee injury. On December 18, 2018, Witherspoon was placed on injured reserve.

Witherspoon finished his second professional season with 37 combined tackles (30 solo), four pass deflections, and a fumble recovery in 14 games and 12 starts.

==== 2019 ====
Witherspoon entered training camp projected to be the No. 2 starting cornerback. He competed against Jason Verrett, K'Waun Williams, and D. J. Reed. Head coach Kyle Shanahan named Witherspoon a starting cornerback to begin the season and paired him with Richard Sherman.

During the season-opening 31–17 road victory over the Tampa Bay Buccaneers, Witherspoon had two solo tackles, a season-high with three pass deflections, and intercepted a pass thrown by Jameis Winston to running back Dare Ogunbowale and returned it 25 yards for his first career touchdown. Witherspoon was inactive due to a foot injury for six consecutive games (Weeks 5–10). In the regular season finale against the Seahawks on Sunday Night Football, he recorded a season-high five solo tackles and two pass deflections during the 26–21 road victory.

Witherspoon finished the regular season with 28 combined tackles (24 solo), a career-high nine pass deflections, an interception, and a touchdown in 10 games and eight starts. The 49ers finished the season atop the NFC West with a 13–3 record and clinched the #1-seed in the playoffs. In the Divisional Round against the Minnesota Vikings, Witherspoon was demoted to a backup role to Emmanuel Moseley after a poor performance. The 49ers went on to reach Super Bowl LIV, but lost 31–20 to the Chiefs. Witherspoon finished the Super Bowl with one tackle.

==== 2020 ====
During training camp, Witherspoon competed against Emmanuel Moseley to be the No. 2 starting cornerback. Head coach Kyle Shanahan named Witherspoon a backup and listed Witherspoon as the fourth cornerback on the depth chart to begin the season, behind Richard Sherman, Moseley, and K'Waun Williams.

Witherspoon was inactive for two games (Weeks 3–4) after injuring his hamstring. After Week 8, he was placed at the bottom of the depth chart as the eighth cornerback, behind Jason Verrett, Emmanuel Moseley, K'Waun Williams, Jamar Taylor, Dontae Johnson, and Ken Webster. Witherspoon was inactive as a healthy scratch for three games (Weeks 9, 10, and 12). Entering Week 13, Witherspoon was promoted to being the fourth cornerback on the depth chart after both Emmanuel Moseley and K'Waun Williams suffered injuries.

During a Week 15 41–33 road loss to the Dallas Cowboys, Witherspoon earned his second start of the season, appearing as a nickelback and recorded a solo tackle and a season-high two pass deflections. In the next game against the Arizona Cardinals, Witherspoon set a season-high with seven solo tackles, made one pass deflection, and had his first interception of the season on a pass attempt thrown by Kyler Murray to wide receiver Christian Kirk late in the fourth quarter to help secure a 20–12 road victory for the 49ers.

Witherspoon finished the 2020 season with 20 combined tackles (17 solo), four pass deflections, and an interception in 11 games and four starts.

=== Seattle Seahawks ===
On March 19, 2021, the Seattle Seahawks signed Witherspoon to a one-year, $4 million contract that was fully guaranteed and included an initial signing bonus of $2.5 million. Defensive coordinator Ken Norton Jr. held an open competition between D. J. Reed, Tre Brown, Tre Flowers, Damarious Randall, and Pierre Desir in order to select their starting cornerbacks.

=== Pittsburgh Steelers ===
==== 2021 ====
On September 3, 2021, the Pittsburgh Steelers executed a trade and agreed to send their 2023 fifth-round pick (151st overall) to the Seattle Seahawks in return for Witherspoon. Upon his initial arrival, head coach Mike Tomlin listed Witherspoon as the sixth cornerback on the depth chart to begin the season, behind Joe Haden, Cameron Sutton, James Pierre, Arthur Maulet, and Justin Layne.

Witherspoon was inactive for the season-opening 23–16 road victory over the Buffalo Bills. He remained inactive as a healthy scratch for the next seven games (Weeks 3–10). Going into Week 11, defensive coordinator Keith Butler promoted Witherspoon and listed him as the fourth cornerback on the depth chart after Joe Haden injured his foot and remained inactive for four games. During Week 13, Witherspoon had a season-high five solo tackles and a pass deflection in a narrow 20–19 victory over the Baltimore Ravens. In the next game against the Vikings on Thursday Night Football, he recorded four solo tackles, three pass deflections, and set a new career-high with two interceptions on pass attempts thrown by Kirk Cousins during the 36–28 road loss. Three weeks later against the Cleveland Browns on Monday Night Football, Witherspoon tied his season-high with three pass deflections and also set a new career-high with his third interception of the season on a pass by Baker Mayfield to wide receiver Donovan Peoples-Jones in the 26–14 victory.

Witherspoon finished the 2021 season with 15 combined tackles (14 solo), nine pass deflections, and a career-high three interceptions in nine games and three starts.

==== 2022 ====
On March 25, 2022, the Steelers signed Witherspoon to a two-year, $8 million contract extension with an initial signing bonus of $2.96 million. He entered training camp projected to be the No. 3 cornerback on the depth chart under the Steelers' new defensive coordinator Teryl Austin. Austin was hired to replace Keith Butler after he chose to retire. Head coach Mike Tomlin named Witherspoon the No. 1 starting cornerback to begin the season in lieu of Levi Wallace and paired him with Cameron Sutton.

Witherspoon started during the season-opener at the Cincinnati Bengals and had a season-high with eight combined tackles (six solo), a pass deflection, and his lone interception of the season on a pass by Joe Burrow to wide receiver Tyler Boyd in the fourth quarter of the 23–20 overtime road victory. Two weeks later against the Browns on Thursday Night Football, Witherspoon recorded five combined tackles (four solo) and a pass deflection before leaving the eventual 29–17 road loss with a hamstring injury. He was inactive for the next four games (Weeks 4–7) due to his injury.

During a Week 8 35–13 road loss to the Eagles, Witherspoon returned from injury and made five solo tackles before head coach Mike Tomlin benched him for the second half after Witherspoon gave up two touchdowns. On December 3, 2022, the Steelers officially placed Witherspoon on injured reserve due to his hamstring injury. He finished the 2022 season with 20 combined tackles (17 solo), two pass deflections, and an interception in 13 games and five starts.

On May 17, 2023, Witherspoon was released.

=== Los Angeles Rams ===
On June 29, 2023, the Los Angeles Rams signed Witherspoon to a one-year, $1.08 million contract. He recorded his first interception as a Ram in a loss to the Cincinnati Bengals on September 25.

On September 11, 2024, Witherspoon was signed to the Rams' practice squad after going unsigned during the offseason. On October 22, he was promoted to the active roster and signed a one-year, $1.12 million contract with the Rams. Witherspoon dove to catch a game-winning interception the Arizona Cardinals on December 28. Witherspoon's play sealed a key win for the Rams, as it helped them clinch the NFC West division crown.

On March 19, 2025, it was announced that Witherspoon agreed to a one-year contract to return for his third season with the Rams. He started at cornerback during the first two games, but suffered a broken scapula in Week 2 and was placed on injured reserve. Witherspoon was activated on November 29. However, he re-broke his scapula during the Wild Card Round against the Panthers and was placed on season-ending injured reserve on January 12, 2026.

=== Washington Commanders ===
On March 26, 2026, Witherspoon signed a one-year contract with the Washington Commanders.

On August 4, 2026, Witherspoon announced his retirement from the NFL.

== NFL career statistics ==
=== Regular season ===
Year	Team	Games		Tackles					Interceptions						Fumbles	
Year	Team	GP	GS	Cmb	Solo	Ast	Sck	TFL	PD	Int	Yds	Avg	Lng	TD	FF	FR
2017	SF	12	9	32	28	4	0.0	0	7	2	42	21.0	23	0	1	0
2018	SF	14	12	37	30	7	0.0	0	4	0	0	0.0	0	0	0	1
2019	SF	10	8	28	24	4	0.0	1	9	1	25	25.0	25T	1	0	0
2020	SF	11	4	20	17	3	0.0	1	4	1	0	0.0	0	0	0	0
2021	PIT	9	3	15	14	1	0.0	1	9	3	45	15.0	41	0	0	0
2022	PIT	4	4	20	17	3	0.0	0	2	1	0	0.0	0	0	0	0
2023	LAR	17	17	52	43	9	0.0	3	14	3	17	5.7	17	0	0	2
2024	LAR	13	5	31	25	6	0.0	0	9	1	0	0	0	0	0	0
2025	LAR	6	2	8	6	2	0.0	0	2	1	0	0	0	0	0	0
Career		96	64	243	204	39	0.0	6	60	13	129	9.9	41	1	1	3

=== Postseason ===
Year	Team	Games		Tackles					Interceptions						Fumbles	
Year	Team	GP	GS	Cmb	Solo	Ast	Sck	TFL	PD	Int	Yds	Avg	Lng	TD	FF	FR
2019	SF	3	1	4	2	2	0.0	0	0	0	0	0.0	0	0	0	0
2021	PIT	1	1	2	2	0	0.0	0	0	0	0	0.0	0	0	0	0
2023	LAR	1	1	2	0	2	0.0	0	0	0	0	0.0	0	0	0	0
2024	LAR	2	2	5	5	0	1.0	1	0	0	0	0.0	0	0	1	0
2025	LAR	1	0	1	1	0	0.0	0	0	0	0	0	0	0	0	0
Career		8	5	14	10	4	1.0	1	0	0	0	0.0	0	0	1	0

== Personal life ==
Witherspoon is the grandson of blues and jazz singer Jimmy Witherspoon.
