= Chris Cook (cornerback) =

American football player (born 1987)

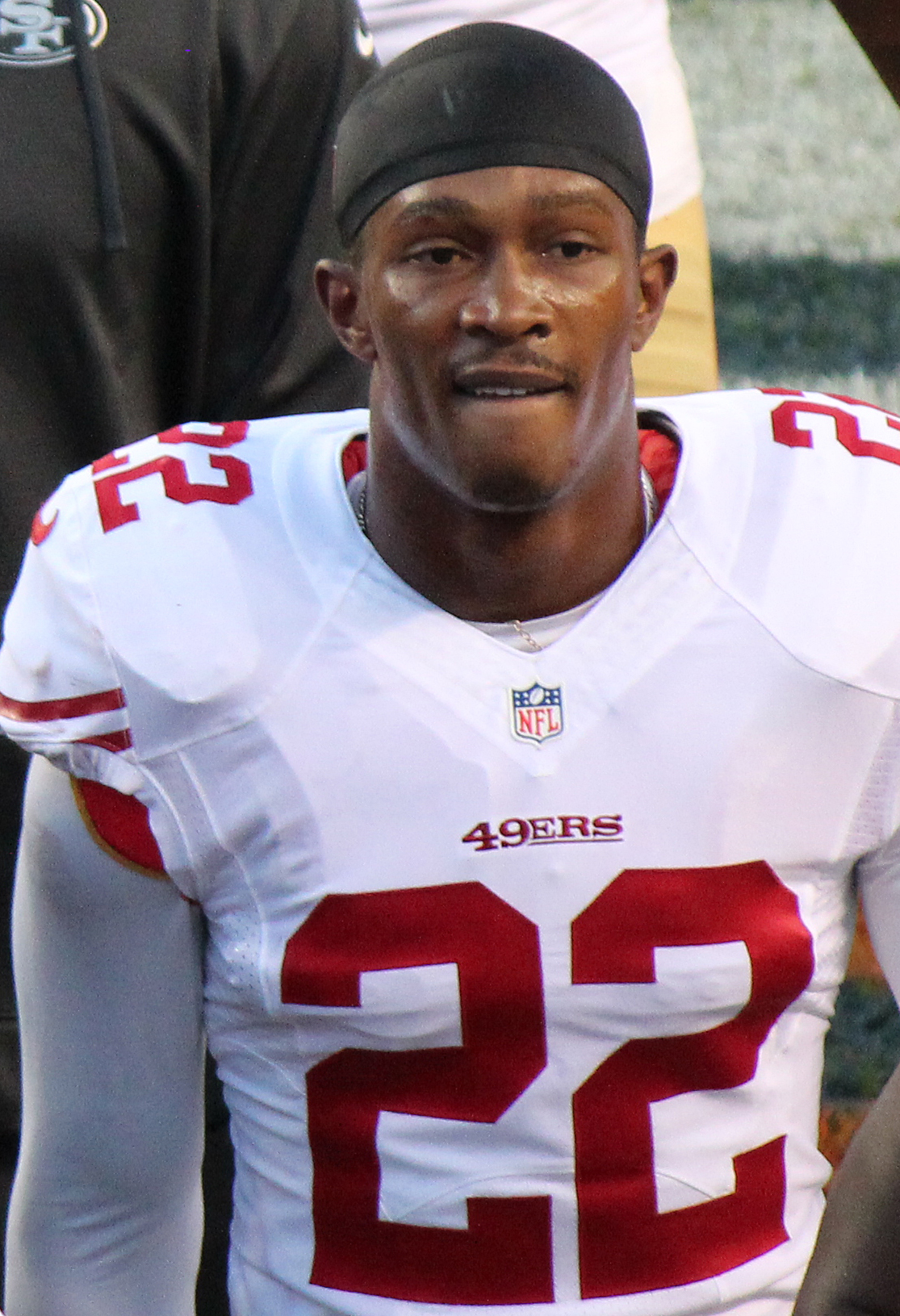
- Cook with the San Francisco 49ers in 2014

No. 31, 20, 22
- Position: Cornerback

Personal information
- Born: February 15, 1987 (age 39); Lynchburg, Virginia, U.S.
- Listed height: 6 ft 2 in (1.88 m)
- Listed weight: 212 lb (96 kg)

Career information
- High school: Heritage (Lynchburg)
- College: Virginia (2005–2009)
- NFL draft: 2010: 2nd round, 34th overall pick

Career history
- Minnesota Vikings (2010–2013); San Francisco 49ers (2014)

Career NFL statistics
- Total tackles: 129
- Sacks: 1
- Pass deflections: 15
- Stats at Pro Football Reference

Christopher O'Shea Cook (born February 15, 1987) is an American former professional football player who was a cornerback in the National Football League (NFL). He played college football for the Virginia Cavaliers and was selected by the Minnesota Vikings in the second round of the 2010 NFL draft.

== Early life ==
Cook attended Heritage High School in Lynchburg, Virginia. He played running back, wide receiver and quarterback on offense, and cornerback on defense. He rushed for 789 yards and 12 touchdowns and caught 10 passes for 250 yards and three more scores as a senior, he also threw six TD passes. He was named first-team all-state defensive back as a junior when he made more than 50 tackles and intercepted eight passes. Considered a three-star by Rivals.com, Cook accepted a scholarship to Virginia over Virginia Tech.

== College career ==
Cook started 31-of-38 games for the Virginia Cavaliers, collecting 143 tackles with 5.5 tackles for loss, one forced fumble, one fumble recovery for a touchdown, 19 passes breakups and seven interceptions, two which he returned for touchdowns. His best season came as a senior, where he collected 40 tackles, including one stop for a three-yard loss, totaled a team-high four interceptions, one which he returned for a touchdown, and deflected six passes, including four on third down.

== Professional career ==
=== Minnesota Vikings ===
Pre-draft measurables
Height	Weight	Arm length	Hand span	40-yard dash	10-yard split	20-yard split	20-yard shuttle	Three-cone drill	Vertical jump	Broad jump	Bench press
6 ft 2 in (1.88 m)	212 lb (96 kg)	32 1/2 in (0.83 m)	9 1/4 in (0.23 m)	4.46 s	1.54 s	2.60 s	4.15 s	6.85 s	38.0 in (0.97 m)	11 ft 0 in (3.35 m)	7 reps
All values from NFL Combine/Pro Day

Cook was drafted by the Vikings in the second round with the 34th overall selection in the 2010 NFL draft.

During a game against the Chicago Bears on December 1, 2013, Cook was ejected for making illegal contact with an official following an Alshon Jeffery touchdown.

=== San Francisco 49ers ===
On March 14, 2014, Cook signed a one-year contract with the San Francisco 49ers. On March 14, 2015, Cook signed another one-year contract with the 49ers. He was released by the team on August 5, 2015.

== NFL career statistics ==
Year	Team	GP	Tackles				Fumbles			Interceptions					
Year	Team	GP	Cmb	Solo	Ast	Sck	FF	FR	Yds	Int	Yds	Avg	Lng	TD	PD
2010	MIN	6	21	16	5	0.0	0	0	0	0	0	0.0	0	0	2
2011	MIN	6	20	17	3	0.0	0	0	0	0	0	0.0	0	0	4
2012	MIN	10	35	27	8	1.0	0	0	0	0	0	0.0	0	0	5
2013	MIN	12	47	41	6	0.0	0	0	0	0	0	0.0	0	0	2
2014	SF	6	6	6	0	0.0	0	0	0	0	0	0.0	0	0	1
Career		40	129	107	22	1.0	0	0	0	0	0	0.0	0	0	14
