= Michael Wilhoite =

American football player and coach (born 1986)

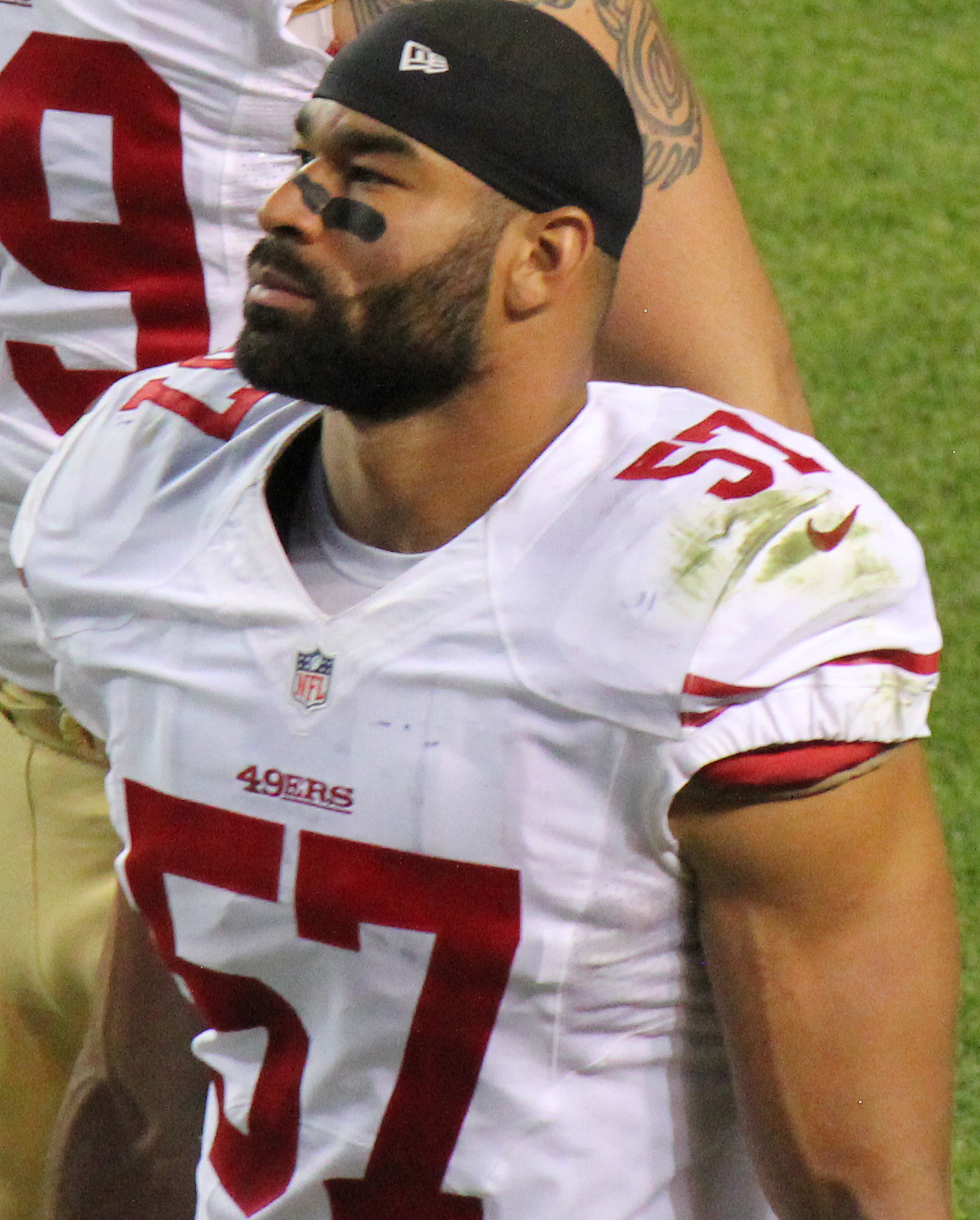
- Wilhoite with the San Francisco 49ers in 2015

Denver Broncos
- Title: Front seven coach

Personal information
- Born: December 7, 1986 (age 39); Manhattan, Kansas, U.S.
- Listed height: 6 ft 0 in (1.83 m)
- Listed weight: 245 lb (111 kg)

Career information
- Position: Linebacker (No. 57)
- High school: Highland Park (Topeka, Kansas)
- College: Washburn (2005–2010)
- NFL draft: 2011: undrafted

Career history

Playing
- Omaha Nighthawks (2011); San Francisco 49ers (2011–2016); Seattle Seahawks (2017)

Coaching
- New Orleans Saints (2019) Special teams assistant; New Orleans Saints (2020) Defensive assistant; Los Angeles Chargers (2021–2022) Linebackers coach; Denver Broncos (2023–2024, 2026–present); Outside linebackers coach (2023–2024); Front seven coach (2026–present)

Career NFL statistics
- Total tackles: 298
- Sacks: 0.5
- Forced fumbles: 2
- Fumble recoveries: 1
- Interceptions: 4
- Stats at Pro Football Reference

Michael Wilhoite (born December 7, 1986) is an American professional football coach and former linebacker who is a front seven coach for the Denver Broncos of the National Football League (NFL). He played college football at Washburn University where he played six different positions, including linebacker and safety. He was originally signed as an undrafted free agent by the Omaha Nighthawks of the United Football League (UFL) in 2011.

== Early life ==
Prior to playing in the NFL, Wilhoite's coaches would use him at other positions due to his athleticism, which also included quarterback in high school. He had played six different positions in total during his college career.

== Professional career ==
Pre-draft measurables
Height	Weight	40-yard dash	10-yard split	20-yard split	20-yard shuttle	Three-cone drill	Vertical jump	Broad jump	Bench press
6 ft 0 5/8 in (1.84 m)	240 lb (109 kg)	4.70 s	1.64 s	2.70 s	4.14 s	6.73 s	36.5 in (0.93 m)	10 ft 9 in (3.28 m)	22 reps
All values from Pro Day

=== Omaha Nighthawks ===
After going unselected in the 2011 NFL draft, Wilhoite signed with the Omaha Nighthawks and spent the entire 2011 UFL season with them.

=== San Francisco 49ers ===
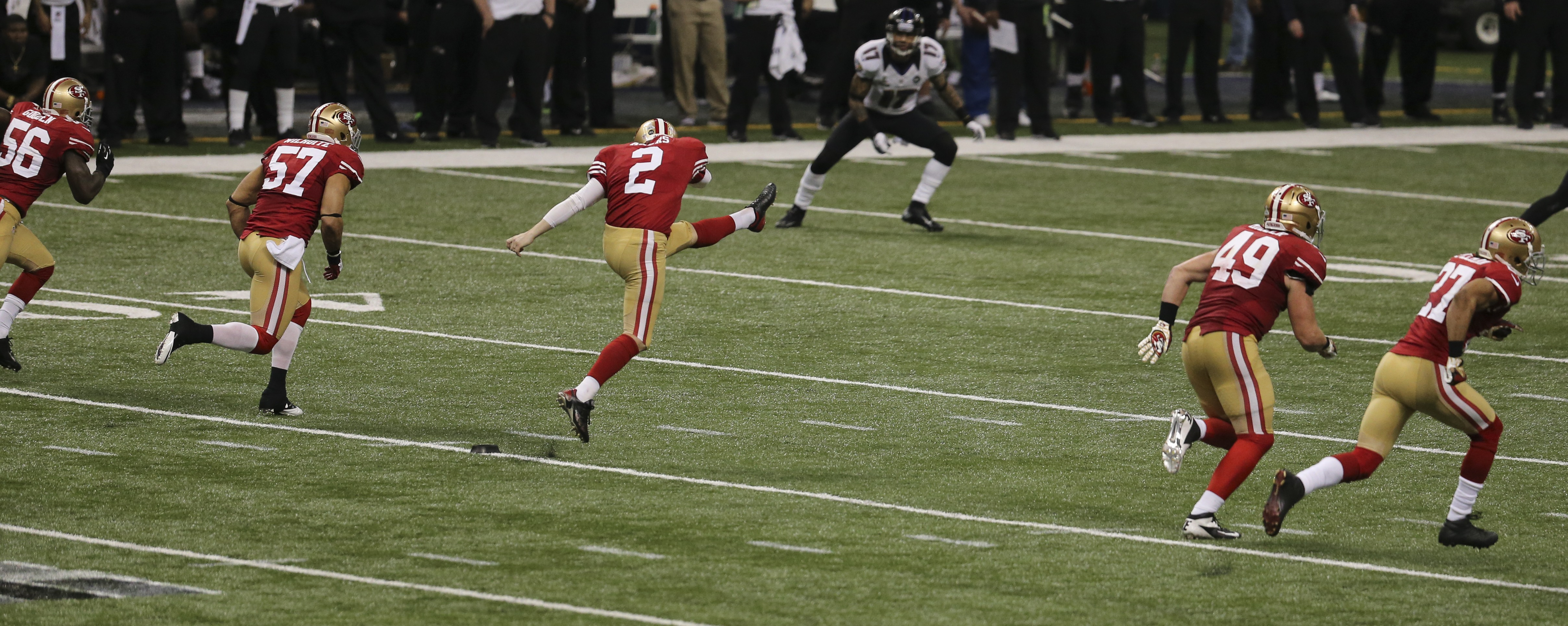
Wilhoite (second on the left) on a special teams play in Super Bowl XLVII.

On December 14, 2011, Wilhoite was signed to the practice squad of the San Francisco 49ers.

He was waived for final roster cuts before the start of the 2012 season, but was signed back to the practice squad on September 1, 2012. After being on the practice squad for twelve weeks in 2012, he was promoted to the active roster. He finished with 11 tackles and made several key plays on special teams during the 49ers run to Super Bowl XLVII, where they fell 34–31 to the Baltimore Ravens.

After the Super Bowl, he remained part of the 49ers active roster the next season.

Set to be a restricted free agent, Wilhoite was offered a tender by the 49ers on March 12, 2014. He signed his tender on April 21.

On November 16, 2014, against the New York Giants, Wilhoite recorded his first career interception, which came off of Eli Manning.

On March 8, 2016, Wilhoite signed a one-year contract extension with the 49ers.

=== Seattle Seahawks ===
On March 24, 2017, Wilhoite signed with the Seattle Seahawks.

== Coaching career ==
=== New Orleans Saints ===
Wilhoite was hired by the New Orleans Saints as a special teams assistant in 2019.

=== Los Angeles Chargers ===
On February 14, 2021, the Los Angeles Chargers hired Wilhoite as their linebackers coach.

On January 19, 2023, Wilhoite was fired by the Chargers, despite developing success stories such as Kyzir White and Drue Tranquill.

=== Denver Broncos ===
On February 23, 2023, the Denver Broncos hired Wilhoite as their outside linebackers coach.

On February 23, 2025, Wilhoite was arrested and charged with second-degree assault of a police officer following an altercation at the Denver International Airport. Due to this incident, the Broncos announced on March 5 that they had fired Wilhoite. On June 8, Wilhoite's attorney announced that his charges had been dismissed.

On July 28, 2026, Wilhoite was rehired by the Broncos as a defensive assistant following the dismissal of his charges.
