= Kenneth Acker =

American gridiron football player (born 1992)

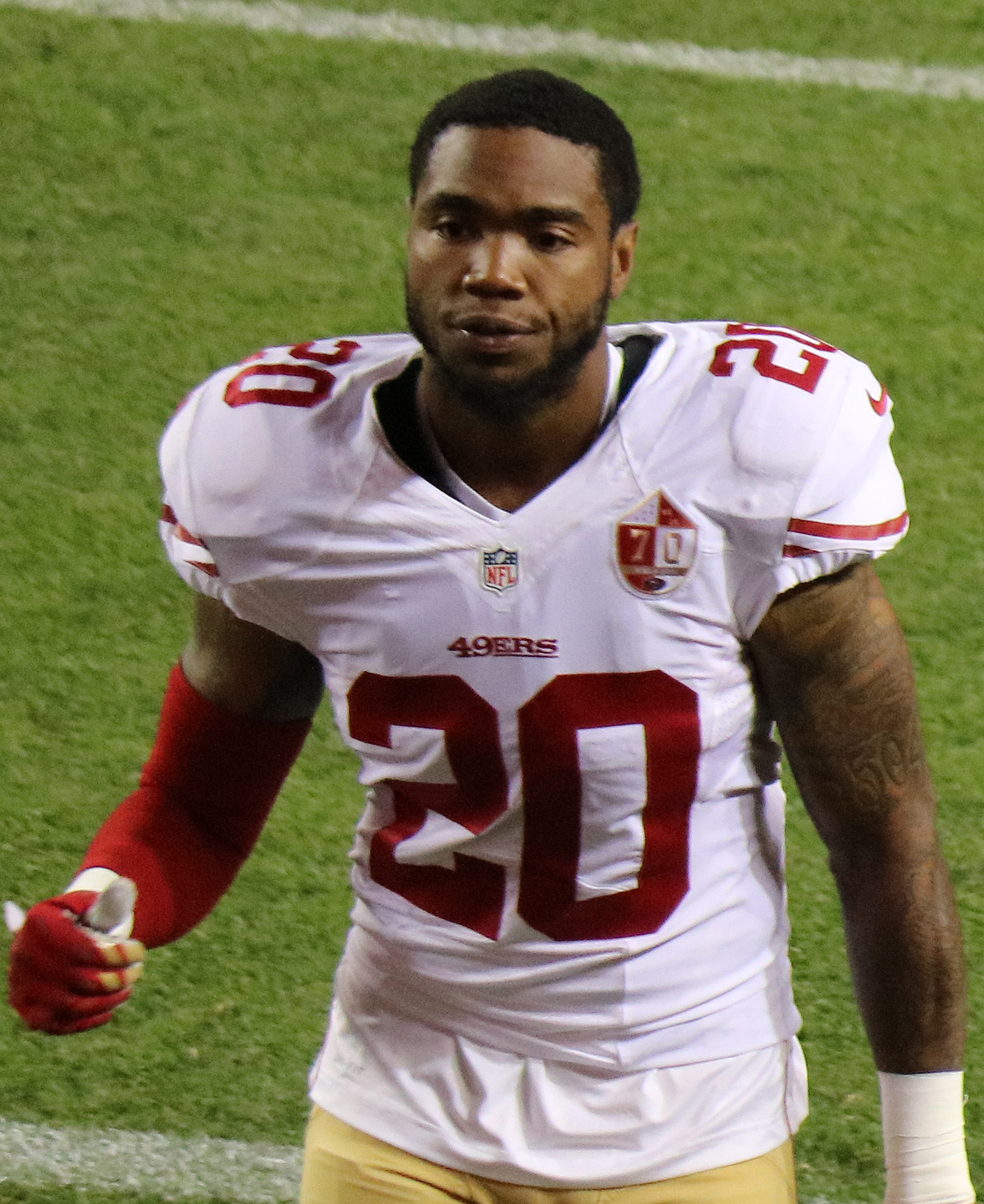
- Acker with the San Francisco 49ers in 2016

No. 20, 25, 27
- Position: Defensive back

Personal information
- Born: February 6, 1992 (age 34); Portland, Oregon, U.S.
- Listed height: 6 ft 0 in (1.83 m)
- Listed weight: 195 lb (88 kg)

Career information
- High school: Grant (Portland)
- College: SMU
- NFL draft: 2014: 6th round, 180th overall pick

Career history
- San Francisco 49ers (2014–2015); Kansas City Chiefs (2016–2017); Indianapolis Colts (2018)*; Jacksonville Jaguars (2018)*; Saskatchewan Roughriders (2021)*
- * Offseason or practice squad member only

Awards and highlights
- Second-team All-C-USA (2012)

Career NFL statistics
- Total tackles: 105
- Pass deflections: 12
- Interceptions: 4
- Stats at Pro Football Reference
- Stats at CFL.ca

Kenneth Acker (born February 6, 1992) is an American former professional football player who was a defensive back in the National Football League (NFL). He played college football for the SMU Mustangs and was selected by the San Francisco 49ers in the sixth round of the 2014 NFL draft.

== College career ==
Acker started out at Southern Methodist University, playing football as a freshman in 2010. He remained in SMU until 2013, when he graduated as a Senior and entered the 2014 NFL draft. During his time at SMU, Acker made 128 tackles, 31 assisted tackles, 6 interceptions, and scored a defensive touchdown. His most successful year was his Junior year in 2012, when he made the Top 10 in the Conference USA for punt return yards, interceptions, interception return yards, interception return touchdowns, and passes defended.

== Professional career ==
=== San Francisco 49ers ===
Acker was selected by the San Francisco 49ers in the sixth round of the 2014 NFL draft (180th overall), before signing a four-year contract with the 49ers. He played during the pre-season, and impressed during the game against the Denver Broncos, drawing an offensive penalty, knocked away a pass, and even made an interception, only for it to be called back due to a penalty. Acker played through the pre-season with a stress fracture in his left foot, and was placed on injured reserve shortly after the diagnosis.

After a strong preseason in 2015, Acker was given the starting cornerback job shortly before the 49ers' regular season opener against the Minnesota Vikings. Acker was on the field for a team high 56 defensive snaps in a 20-3 49ers victory. Through Week 14, Acker had impressed in his starting role, having amassed three interceptions (tied for the team lead), eight pass deflections, and 58 solo tackles. He lost his starting job that week to Dontae Johnson.

=== Kansas City Chiefs ===
On August 27, 2016, Acker was traded to the Kansas City Chiefs in exchange for an undisclosed draft pick.

=== Indianapolis Colts ===
On April 11, 2018, Acker signed with the Indianapolis Colts. He was released by the Colts on May 15.

=== Jacksonville Jaguars ===
On August 11, 2018, Acker signed with the Jacksonville Jaguars. He was placed on injured reserve on September 1. Acker was released by the Jaguars on September 8.

=== Saskatchewan Roughriders ===
On January 29, 2021, Acker signed with the Saskatchewan Roughriders. He was released by Saskatchewan on July 16.
