= Keith Reaser =

American football player (born 1991)

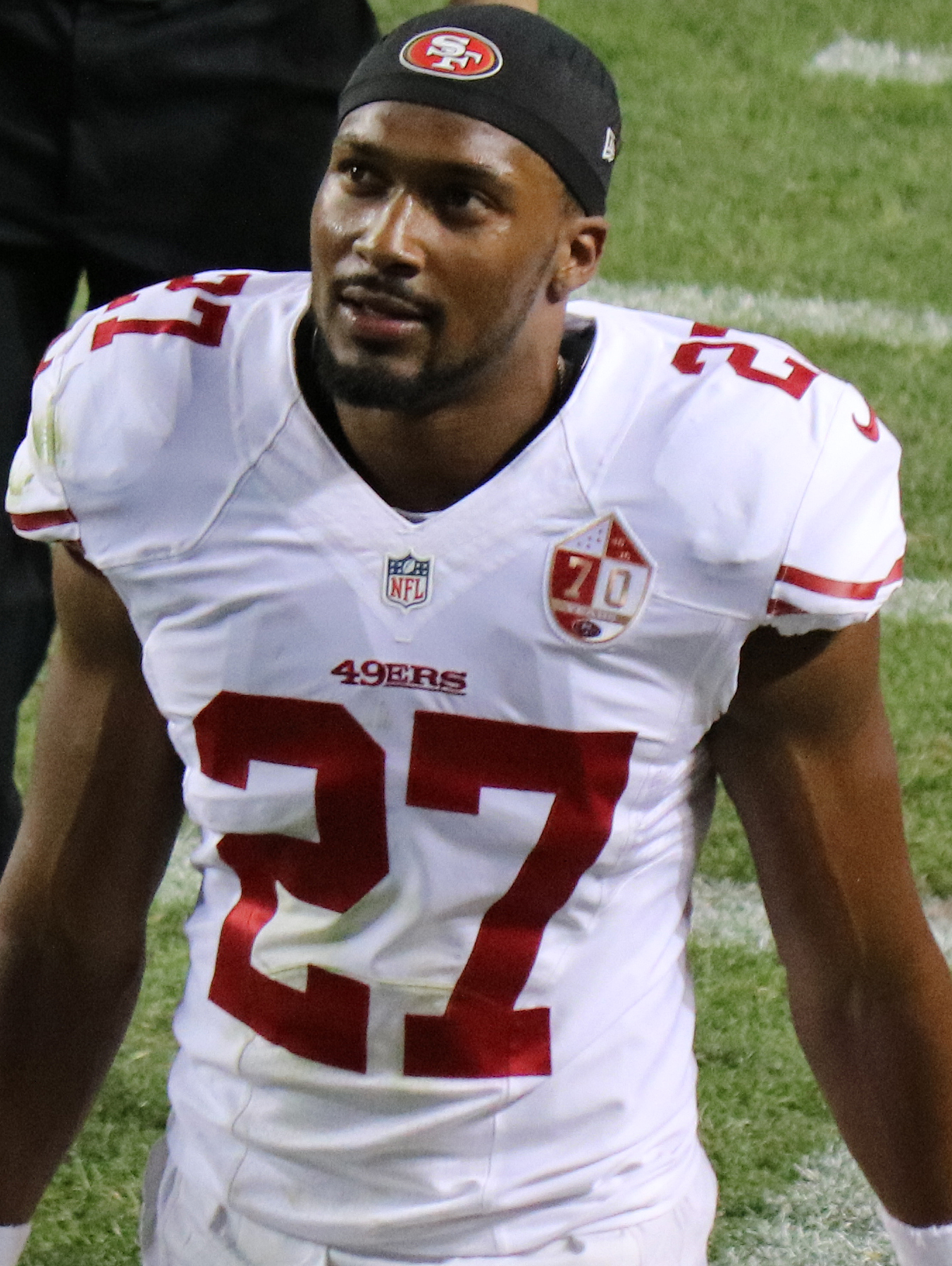
- Reaser with the San Francisco 49ers in 2016

No. 27, 40
- Position: Cornerback

Personal information
- Born: July 31, 1991 (age 35); Miami, Florida, U.S.
- Listed height: 6 ft 0 in (1.83 m)
- Listed weight: 190 lb (86 kg)

Career information
- High school: Miami Killian (Kendall, Florida)
- College: Florida Atlantic
- NFL draft: 2014: 5th round, 170th overall pick

Career history
- San Francisco 49ers (2014–2017); Kansas City Chiefs (2017–2018); Orlando Apollos (2019); Kansas City Chiefs (2019)

Awards and highlights
- Super Bowl champion (LIV)

Career NFL statistics
- Total tackles: 38
- Sacks: 1
- Forced fumbles: 2
- Pass deflections: 7
- Stats at Pro Football Reference

Keith Reaser (born July 31, 1991) is an American former professional football player who was a cornerback in the National Football League (NFL). He was selected by the San Francisco 49ers in the fifth round of the 2014 NFL draft. He played college football for the Florida Atlantic Owls.

== College career ==
Reaser tore his ACL in a game against the University of Alabama at Birmingham Blazers. In his college career for the Owls, he recorded 32 starts, 158 tackles, five interceptions, and one fumble recovery.

== Professional career ==
=== San Francisco 49ers ===
Reaser was selected by the San Francisco 49ers in the fifth round, 170th overall, in the 2014 NFL draft.

On September 16, 2017, Reaser was released by the 49ers.

=== Kansas City Chiefs (first stint) ===
On September 19, 2017, Reaser was signed to the Kansas City Chiefs' practice squad. He was promoted to the active roster on December 15, 2017.

On September 1, 2018, Reaser was waived with an injury designation by the Chiefs. After going unclaimed on waivers, he was placed on the Chiefs injured reserve. He was released with an injury settlement on September 12, 2018.

=== Orlando Apollos ===
In 2019, Reaser joined the Orlando Apollos of the Alliance of American Football. During week 2 of the 2019 AAF season, after a game against the San Antonio Commanders where he had 2 tackles, 3 pass deflections, and a 38-yard interception return, Reaser was named the defensive player of the week. Reaser recorded 12 tackles and three interceptions in eight games with the Apollos before the AAF suspended operations.

=== Kansas City Chiefs (second stint) ===
Reaser signed with the Chiefs on April 4, 2019. He suffered a torn Achilles in practice and was placed on injured reserve on August 8, 2019. Without Reaser, The Chiefs won Super Bowl LIV 31–20 against his former team, the 49ers.

== Personal life ==
Reaser's cousin is Sean Taylor, who played for the Washington Redskins and served as an inspiration to him.
