= 2015 San Francisco 49ers season =

American football team season

- Owner: Jed York
- General manager: Trent Baalke
- Head coach: Jim Tomsula
- Offensive coordinator: Geep Chryst
- Defensive coordinator: Eric Mangini
- Home stadium: Levi's Stadium

Results
- Record: 5–11
- Division place: 4th NFC West
- Playoffs: Did not qualify
- All-Pros: NaVorro Bowman (1st team)
- Pro Bowlers: ILB NaVorro Bowman; OT Joe Staley

Uniform
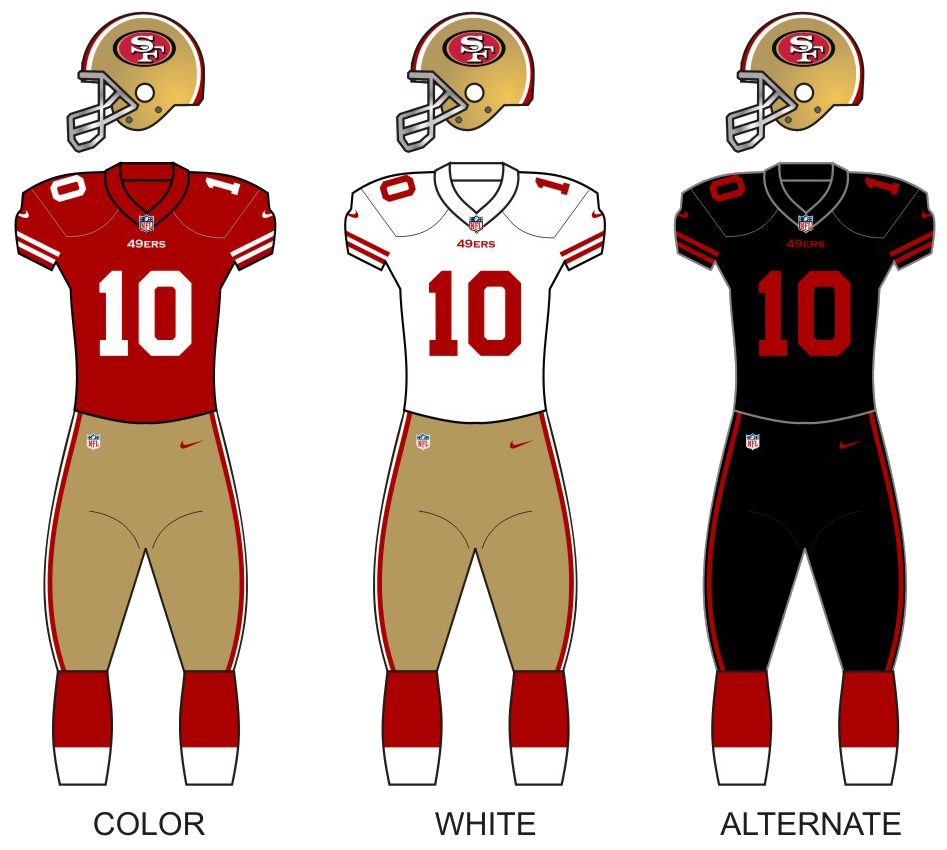

The 2015 season was the San Francisco 49ers' 66th in the National Football League (NFL), their 70th overall, their second playing home games at Levi's Stadium and their only season under head coach Jim Tomsula. They were attempting to make history as the first team to play in a Super Bowl on their own home field, but they failed to improve on their 8–8 record from 2014, and ended with a 5–11 record to miss the playoffs for the second season in a row and suffered their first losing season since 2010 and their first last-place finish since 2005. The 49ers played poorly on both sides of the football all season, finishing last in the NFL in scoring offense and 18th in scoring defense, resulting in the firings of Tomsula and almost all of his staff at seasons end, including both coordinators. Beleaguered quarterback Colin Kaepernick started only 8 games during the season before he was benched for back-up Blaine Gabbert due to struggles.

== Offseason ==
=== Coaching changes ===
With their loss to the Seattle Seahawks in Week 15 of the 2014–15 season, the 49ers were mathematically eliminated from the postseason, exacerbating tensions between head coach Jim Harbaugh and general manager Trent Baalke. After the season ended, the 49ers and Harbaugh mutually agreed to end his contract. On January 14, 2015, Jim Tomsula was promoted to head coach after serving as defensive line coach with the team since 2007; it was his second time at the helm, as he previously served as the 49ers' interim head coach for one game, after Mike Singletary's firing in 2010.

=== Roster changes ===
==== Free Agency ====
Position	Player	Free agency tag	Date signed/released	2015 team	Notes
QB	Blaine Gabbert	UFA	March 12, 2015	San Francisco 49ers	Signed 2-year/$2 million
QB	Josh Johnson	UFA	April 2, 2015	Cincinnati Bengals	
RB	Frank Gore	UFA	March 10, 2015	Indianapolis Colts	Signed 3-year/$12 million
RB	Alfonso Smith	UFA	-	-	-
RB	Phillip Tanner	UFA	-	-	-
WR	Michael Crabtree	UFA	April 13, 2015	Oakland Raiders	Signed 1 year/$3.2 million
WR	Brandon Lloyd	UFA	-	-	-
WR	Kassim Osgood	UFA	-	-	-
G	Mike Iupati	UFA	March 10, 2015	Arizona Cardinals	Signed 5-year/$40 million
LB	Dan Skuta	UFA	March 11, 2015	Jacksonville Jaguars	Signed 5-year/$20.5 million
LB	Desmond Bishop	UFA	March 31, 2015	San Francisco 49ers	Signed 1 year
CB	Chris Culliver	UFA	March 13, 2015	Washington Redskins	Signed 4-year/$32 million
CB	Perrish Cox	UFA	March 14, 2015	Tennessee Titans	Signed 3-year/$15 million
CB	Chris Cook	UFA	March 14, 2015	San Francisco 49ers	Signed 1 year
LS	Kyle Nelson	RFA	March 6, 2015	San Francisco 49ers	Signed 4-year
TE	Garrett Celek	RFA	March 12, 2015	San Francisco 49ers	Signed 1 year
RFA: Restricted free agent, UFA: Unrestricted free agent, ERFA: Exclusive rights free agent LEGEND – Light green background indicates a player has been re-signed by the 49ers. – Light red background indicates a player has departed the 49ers.

==== Signings ====
Position	Player	2014 Team	Date signed	Notes
DE	Darnell Dockett	Arizona Cardinals	March 5, 2015	Signed 2-year/$7.5 million
WR	Jerome Simpson	Minnesota Vikings	March 5, 2015	Signed 2-year deal
WR	Torrey Smith	Baltimore Ravens	March 11, 2015	Signed 5-year/$40 million
RB	Reggie Bush	Detroit Lions	March 14, 2015	Signed 1 year/2.5 million
CB	Shareece Wright	San Diego Chargers	March 14, 2015	Signed 1 year/$3 million
OT	Erik Pears	Buffalo Bills	March 14, 2015	Signed 2-year/$4.7 million
LB	Nick Bellore	New York Jets	April 3, 2015	Signed 2-year deal
LB	Philip Wheeler	Miami Dolphins	April 30, 2015	
LB	Shawn Lemon		August 8, 2015	
LB	Steve Beauharnais	Washington Redskins	August 7, 2015	

Indicates that the player was a free agent at the end of his respective team's 2014 season.

==== Departures ====
Position	Player	Date	Notes
S	Bubba Ventrone	March 3, 2015	Retired
LB	Patrick Willis	March 10, 2015	Retired
WR	Stevie Johnson	March 12, 2015	Released
LB	Chris Borland	March 16, 2015	Retired
OT	Jonathan Martin	March 26, 2015	Released
WR	Trindon Holliday	April 30, 2015	Released
G	Fouimalo Fonoti	April 30, 2015	Waived
WR	Lance Lewis	April 30, 2015	Waived
DE	Justin Smith	May 18, 2015	Retired
OT	Anthony Davis	June 5, 2015	Retired
P	Andy Lee	June 6, 2015	Traded
LB	Aldon Smith	August 7, 2015	Released
CB	Chris Cook	August 5, 2015	Released
TE	Vernon Davis	November 2, 2015	Traded

== 2015 NFL draft ==
San Francisco 49ers 2015 NFL Draft selections
Draft order			Player name	Position	Height	Weight	College	Notes
Round	Choice	Overall	Player name	Position	Height	Weight	College	Notes
1	15	15	Traded to the San Diego Chargers^{[a]}					
1	17	17	Arik Armstead	Defensive end	6'7"	292	Oregon	From Chargers^{[a]}
2	14	46	Jaquiski Tartt	Safety	6'1"	221	Samford	
3	15	79	Eli Harold	Defensive end	6'3"	247	Virginia	
4	14	113	Traded to the Buffalo Bills^{[b]}					
4	18	117	Blake Bell	Tight end	6'6"	252	Oklahoma	From Chargers^{[a]}
4	27	126	Mike Davis	Running back	5'9"	217	South Carolina	From Broncos^{[c]}
4	33	132	DeAndre Smelter	Wide receiver	6'2"	226	Georgia Tech	Compensatory pick
5	15	151	Traded to the Indianapolis Colts^{[f]}					
5	29	165	Bradley Pinion	Punter	6'5"	229	Clemson	From Colts^{[f]}
6	14	190	Ian Silberman	Guard	6'5"	306	Boston College	
7	15	232	Traded to the Miami Dolphins^{[d]}					
7	27	244	Trenton Brown	Guard	6'8"	355	Florida	From Colts^{[f]}
7	29	246	Traded to the Dallas Cowboys^{[g]}					From Colts^{^{[e]}}
7	37	254	Rory Anderson	Tight end			South Carolina	Compensatory pick

Notes

^{^[a]} The 49ers traded their first-round selection (No. 15 overall) to the San Diego Chargers in exchange for San Diego's first- and fourth-round selection (Nos. 17 and 117 overall, respectively) as well a fifth-round selection in 2016.
^{^[b]} The 49ers traded a conditional fourth-round selection to the Buffalo Bills in exchange for wide receiver Stevie Johnson; the selection could be upgraded to a third-rounder pending Johnson's statistics in 2014.
^{^[c]} The 49ers acquired an additional fourth-round selection as part of a trade that sent their 2014 second- and seventh-round selections to the Denver Broncos.
^{^[d]} The 49ers traded a seventh-round selection to the Miami Dolphins in exchange for offensive tackle Jonathan Martin.
^{^[e]} The 49ers acquired an additional seventh-round selection in a trade that sent linebacker Cam Johnson to the Indianapolis Colts.
^{^[f]} The 49ers traded their fifth-round selection (No. 151 overall) to the Indianapolis Colts in exchange for Indianapolis's fifth- and seventh-round selection (Nos. 165 and 244 overall, respectively).
^{^[g]} The 49ers acquired a sixth-round selection in 2016 as part of a trade that sent their seventh-round selections (No. 246) to Dallas Cowboys.

=== Undrafted free agents ===
Position	Player	College	Notes
RB	Jarryd Hayne	None	Played professional Rugby league from 2006 to 2014 in Australia
QB	Dylan Thompson	South Carolina	
WR	Dres Anderson	Utah	
OLB	Marcus Rush	Michigan State	
WR	Issac Blakeney	Duke	
OT	Patrick Miller	Auburn	
WR	Darius Davis	Henderson State	
WR	DeAndrew White	Alabama	

== Staff ==
2015 San Francisco 49ers staff
Front office: Co-Chairman – Denise DeBartolo York; Co-Chairman – John York; Chief executive officer – Jed York; Co-Owner – Gideon Yu; President – Paraag Marathe; Chief Operating Officer – Al Guido; General manager – Trent Baalke; Senior Personnel Executive – Tom Gamble; Director of pro personnel – Mike Williams; Director of college scouting – Matt Malaspina; Director of football administration & Analytics – Brian Hampton; Special Assistant to the head coach – Bill Nayes; Head coaches: Head coach – Jim Tomsula; Offensive coaches: Offensive coordinator – Geep Chryst; Quarterbacks – Steve Logan; Running backs – Tom Rathman; Wide receivers – Ronald Curry; Wide receivers – Adam Henry; Tight ends – Tony Sparano; Offensive line – Chris Foerster; Assistant offensive line – Eric Wolford; Offensive assistant – DJ Boldin; Offensive assistant – T. C. McCartney	Defensive coaches: Defensive coordinator – Eric Mangini; Defensive line – Scott Brown; Linebackers – Clancy Pendergast; Senior defensive assistant/linebackers – Jason Tarver; Defensive backs – Tim Lewis; Defensive assistant – Ejiro Evero; Defensive assistant – Aubrayo Franklin; Defensive assistant – Mick Lombardi; Special teams coaches: Special teams coordinator – Thomas McGaughey; Assistant special teams – Richard Hightower; Strength and conditioning: Director of human performance – Mark Uyeyama; Strength and conditioning assistant – Brian Johnson; Strength and Conditioning/Nutrition Assistant – Kurt Schmidt; Strength and conditioning assistant – David Young

== Final roster ==
2015 San Francisco 49ers roster
Quarterbacks (QB): 2 Blaine Gabbert; 13 Dylan Thompson; Running backs (RB): 22 Mike Davis; 30 Kendall Gaskins; 32 DuJuan Harris; 38 Jarryd Hayne; 49 Bruce Miller FB; Wide receivers (WR): 81 Anquan Boldin; 10 Bruce Ellington; 11 Quinton Patton; 14 Jerome Simpson; 82 Torrey Smith; 18 DeAndrew White; Tight ends (TE): 84 Blake Bell; 83 Je'Ron Hamm; 46 Brian Leonhardt; 89 Vance McDonald	Offensive linemen (OL): 77 Trent Brown T; 65 Jordan Devey G; 67 Daniel Kilgore C; 66 Marcus Martin C; 71 Erik Pears T/G; 62 Ian Silberman G; 74 Joe Staley T; 60 Brandon Thomas G; 61 Andrew Tiller G; Defensive linemen (DL): 91 Arik Armstead DE; 92 Quinton Dial DE; 63 Tony Jerod-Eddie DE; 64 Mike Purcell DE; 93 Ian Williams NT	Linebackers (LB): 54 Ray-Ray Armstrong OLB; 50 Nick Bellore ILB; 53 NaVorro Bowman ILB; 55 Ahmad Brooks OLB; 95 Tank Carradine OLB; 58 Eli Harold OLB; 51 Gerald Hodges ILB; 96 Corey Lemonier OLB; 59 Aaron Lynch OLB; 56 Shayne Skov OLB; Defensive backs (DB): 20 Kenneth Acker CB; 26 Tramaine Brock CB; 47 Marcus Cromartie CB; 43 Chris Davis CB; 36 Dontae Johnson CB; 27 Keith Reaser CB; 35 Eric Reid FS; 29 Jaquiski Tartt SS; 25 Jimmie Ward CB/S; Special teams (ST): 9 Phil Dawson K; 86 Kyle Nelson LS; 5 Bradley Pinion P	Practice squad: 4 McLeod Bethel-Thompson QB; 19 DiAndre Campbell WR; 40 Jamie Childers TE; 69 Donald Hawkins T; 68 Kaleb Ramsey DE; 45 Marcus Rush OLB; 33 Kyle Sebetic CB; 78 Garrison Smith NT; Reserve: 17 Dres Anderson WR (IR); 48 Rory Anderson TE (IR); 41 Antoine Bethea SS (IR); 75 Alex Boone G (IR); 23 Reggie Bush RB (IR); 88 Garrett Celek TE (IR); 90 Glenn Dorsey DE (IR); 24 Shaun Draughn RB (IR); 28 Carlos Hyde RB (IR); 7 Colin Kaepernick QB (IR); 31 L. J. McCray FS (IR); 15 DeAndre Smelter WR (NF-Inj.); 57 Michael Wilhoite ILB (IR); Rookies in italics 53 active, 13 reserve, 8 practice squad

== Schedule ==
=== Preseason ===
Week	Date	Opponent	Result	Record	Venue	Recap
1	August 15	at Houston Texans	**L** 10–23	0–1	NRG Stadium	Recap
2	August 23	Dallas Cowboys	**W** 23–6	1–1	Levi's Stadium	Recap
3	August 29	at Denver Broncos	**L** 12–19	1–2	Sports Authority Field at Mile High	Recap
4	September 3	San Diego Chargers	**W** 14–12	2–2	Levi's Stadium	Recap

=== Regular season ===
Week	Date	Opponent	Result	Record	Venue	Recap
1	September 14	Minnesota Vikings	**W** 20–3	1–0	Levi's Stadium	Recap
2	September 20	at Pittsburgh Steelers	**L** 18–43	1–1	Heinz Field	Recap
3	September 27	at **Arizona Cardinals**	**L** 7–47	1–2	University of Phoenix Stadium	Recap
4	October 4	Green Bay Packers	**L** 3–17	1–3	Levi's Stadium	Recap
5	October 11	at New York Giants	**L** 27–30	1–4	MetLife Stadium	Recap
6	October 18	Baltimore Ravens	**W** 25–20	2–4	Levi's Stadium	Recap
7	October 22	**Seattle Seahawks**	**L** 3–20	2–5	Levi's Stadium	Recap
8	November 1	at **St. Louis Rams**	**L** 6–27	2–6	Edward Jones Dome	Recap
9	November 8	Atlanta Falcons	**W** 17–16	3–6	Levi's Stadium	Recap
10	Bye					
11	November 22	at **Seattle Seahawks**	**L** 13–29	3–7	CenturyLink Field	Recap
12	November 29	**Arizona Cardinals**	**L** 13–19	3–8	Levi's Stadium	Recap
13	December 6	at Chicago Bears	**W** 26–20 (OT)	4–8	Soldier Field	Recap
14	December 13	at Cleveland Browns	**L** 10–24	4–9	FirstEnergy Stadium	Recap
15	December 20	Cincinnati Bengals	**L** 14–24	4–10	Levi's Stadium	Recap
16	December 27	at Detroit Lions	**L** 17–32	4–11	Ford Field	Recap
17	January 3	**St. Louis Rams**	**W** 19–16 (OT)	5–11	Levi's Stadium	Recap
Note: Intra-division opponents are in **bold** text.

=== Game summaries ===
==== Week 1: vs. Minnesota Vikings ====
Week One: Minnesota Vikings at San Francisco 49ers– Game summary

Quarter	1	2	3	4	Total
Vikings	0	0	0	3	**3**
**49ers**	0	7	3	10	**20**

at Levi's Stadium, Santa Clara, California

- Date: September 14
- Game time: 7:20 p.m. PDT
- Game weather: 70 °F (21 °C), partly cloudy
- Game attendance: 70,499
- Referee: Ed Hochuli
- TV announcers (ESPN): Chris Berman, Trent Dilfer and Lindsay Czarniak
- Recap, Gamebook

Game information

**First quarter**

- No scoring plays

**Second quarter**

- SF – Carlos Hyde 10 Yd Run (Phil Dawson Kick), 0:47. 49ers 7–0. **Drive: 11 plays, 93 yards, 4:58.**

**Third quarter**

- SF – Phil Dawson 30 Yd Field Goal, 4:32 49ers 10–0. **Drive: 14 plays, 73 yards, 5:42.**

**Fourth quarter**

- MIN – Blair Walsh 37 Yd Field Goal, 14:43 49ers 10–3. **Drive: 11 plays, 66 yards, 4:49.**
- SF – Carlos Hyde 17 Yd Run (Phil Dawson Kick), 9:30. 49ers 17–3. **Drive: 10 plays, 80 yards, 5:13.**
- SF – Phil Dawson 25 Yd Field Goal, 6:08. 49ers 20–3. **Drive: 5 plays, 23 yards, 2:14.**

**Top passers**

- MIN – Teddy Bridgewater - 23/32, 231 yards, 0 TD, 1 INT
- SF – Colin Kaepernick - 17/26, 165 yards, 0 TD, 0 INT

**Top rushers**

- MIN – Adrian Peterson - 10 rushes, 31 yards
- SF – Carlos Hyde - 26 rushes, 168 yards, 2 TD

**Top receivers**

- MIN – Mike Wallace - 6 rec, 66 yards
- SF – Vernon Davis - 3 rec, 47 yards

**Top tacklers**

- MIN – Anthony Barr – 12 tackles
- SF – Antoine Bethea – 8 tackles

In the 49ers' first game with new head coach Jim Tomsula, the 49ers defeated the Minnesota Vikings 20–3 on Monday Night Football. In his first career start, Carlos Hyde rushed 26 times for 168 yards and two touchdowns. Hyde's 168 rushing yards were the most by a 49ers player since 2012, when Colin Kaepernick rushed for 181 against the Packers. Colin Kaepernick went 17 for 26 with 165 yards passing. The 49ers defense was stout, holding the Vikings to just three points and sacking Vikings quarterback Teddy Bridgewater five times. Adrian Peterson, returning from suspension, rushed for only 31 yards on 10 carries. This game also marked the return of NaVorro Bowman, who missed all of the 2014 season with an injury. He had seven tackles and a sack in the season opener. In addition, the 49ers introduced black alternate uniforms.

==== Week 2: at Pittsburgh Steelers ====
Week Two: San Francisco 49ers at Pittsburgh Steelers– Game summary

Quarter	1	2	3	4	Total
49ers	0	3	0	15	**18**
**Steelers**	8	21	0	14	**43**

at Heinz Field, Pittsburgh, Pennsylvania

- Date: September 20
- Game time: 1:00 p.m. EDT/10:00 am. PDT
- Game weather: 66 °F (19 °C), partly cloudy
- Game attendance: 66,472
- Referee: Craig Wrolstad
- TV announcers (Fox): Kenny Albert, Daryl Johnston and Laura Okmin
- Recap, Gamebook

Game information

**First quarter**

- PIT – Heath Miller 2 Yd pass from Ben Roethlisberger (Ben Roethlisberger–Antonio Brown pass), 4:20. Steelers 8–0. **Drive: 8 plays, 83 yards, 3:19.**

**Second quarter**

- SF – Phil Dawson 47 Yd Field Goal, 10:27. Steelers 8–3. **Drive: 17 plays, 58 yards, 8:53.**
- PIT – DeAngelo Williams 2 Yd Run (Ben Roethlisberger–Heath Miller pass), 8:07. Steelers 16–3. **Drive: 7 plays, 80 yards, 2:20.**
- PIT – Darrius Heyward-Bey 35 Yd pass from Ben Roethlisberger (kick failed), 5:45. Steelers 22–3. **Drive: 1 play, 35 yards, 0:07.**
- PIT – DeAngelo Williams 2 Yd Run (Josh Scobee Kick), 1:58. Steelers 29–3. **Drive: 6 plays, 42 yards, 2:42.**

**Third quarter**

- No scoring plays.

**Fourth quarter**

- SF – Anquan Boldin 14 Yd pass from Colin Kaepernick (Phil Dawson Kick), 13:16. Steelers 29–10. **Drive: 6 plays, 64 yards, 1:51.**
- PIT – DeAngelo Williams 1 Yd Run (Josh Scobee Kick), 10:25. Steelers 36–10. **Drive: 6 plays, 80 yards, 2:51.**
- SF – Torrey Smith 75 Yd pass from Colin Kaepernick (Colin Kaepernick–Torrey Smith pass), 9:43. Steelers 36–18. **Drive: 2 plays, 80 yards, 0:42.**
- PIT – Antonio Brown 7 Yd pass from Ben Roethlisberger (Josh Scobee Kick), 7:43. Steelers 43–18. **Drive: 5 plays, 80 yards, 2:00.**

**Top passers**

- SF – Colin Kaepernick - 33/46, 335 yards, 2 TD
- PIT – Ben Roethlisberger - 21/27, 369 yards, 3 TD

**Top rushers**

- SF – Colin Kaepernick - 9 rushes, 51 yards
- PIT – DeAngelo Williams - 20 rushes, 77 yards, 3 TD

**Top receivers**

- SF – Torrey Smith - 6 rec, 120 yards, 1 TD
- PIT – Antonio Brown - 9 rec, 195 yards, 1 TD

**Top tacklers**

- SF – Eric Reid - 6 tackles
- PIT – Ryan Shazier - 15 tackles

The 49ers' first road game of the year ended in a disaster. The 49ers defense had no answer for Ben Roethlisberger, who went 21 for 27,369 yards and three touchdown passes as the Steelers won 43–18. The Steelers took a commanding 29–3 halftime lead. Despite only scoring 18 points, the 49ers offense opened up in the second half, with Kaepernick leading the 49ers into the Steelers red zone four times, but only able to score one touchdown (along with a field goal and two turnovers on downs). The highlight for the 49ers was Kaepernick hitting wide receiver Torrey Smith for a 75-yard touchdown pass in the fourth quarter. The Steelers defense had a field day on Kaepernick, sacking him 5 times and making him lose a fumble.

With the loss, the 49ers fell to 1–1.

==== Week 3: at Arizona Cardinals ====
Week Three: San Francisco 49ers at Arizona Cardinals– Game summary

Quarter	1	2	3	4	Total
49ers	0	7	0	0	**7**
**Cardinals**	14	17	9	7	**47**

at University of Phoenix Stadium, Glendale, Arizona

- Date: September 27
- Game time: 1:05 pm. PDT
- Game weather: Played indoors (retractable roof closed)
- Game attendance: 63,663
- Referee: Tony Corrente
- TV announcers (Fox): Thom Brennaman, Charles Davis and Tony Siragusa
- Recap, Gamebook

Game information

**First quarter**

- ARI – Justin Bethel 21 Yd Interception Return (Chandler Catanzaro Kick), 11:06. Cardinals 7–0. **Drive: 3 plays, -1 yard, 1:04.**
- ARI – Tyrann Mathieu 33 Yd Interception Return (Chandler Catanzaro Kick), 9:03. Cardinals 14–0. **Drive: 4 plays, 11 yards, 2:03.**

**Second quarter**

- ARI – Chris Johnson 6 Yd Run (Chandler Catanzaro Kick), 14:56. Cardinals 21–0. **Drive: 10 plays, 81 yards, 5:58.**
- ARI – Chris Johnson 1 Yd Run (Chandler Catanzaro Kick), 7:49. Cardinals 28–0. **Drive: 9 plays, 81 yards, 4:04.**
- SF – Colin Kaepernick 12 Yd Run (Phil Dawson Kick), 2:03. Cardinals 28–7. **Drive: 3 plays, 19 yards, 1:05.**
- ARI – Chandler Catanzaro 22 Yd Field Goal, 0:01. Cardinals 31–7. **Drive: 5 plays, 21 yards, 0:30.**

**Third quarter**

- ARI – Larry Fitzgerald 4 Yd pass from Carson Palmer (Chandler Catanzaro Kick), 12:29. Cardinals 38–7. **Drive: 4 plays, 58 yards, 2:18.**
- ARI – Carlos Hyde tackled by Kevin Minter in the end zone for a safety, 4:18. Cardinals 40–7. **Drive: 1 play, -1 yard, 0:06.**

**Fourth quarter**

- ARI – Larry Fitzgerald 8 Yd pass from Carson Palmer (Chandler Catanzaro Kick), 5:15. Cardinals 47–7. **Drive: 13 plays, 79 yards, 7:42.**

**Top passers**

- SF – Colin Kaepernick - 9/19, 67 yards, 4 INT
- ARI – Carson Palmer - 20/32, 311 yards, 2 TD, INT

**Top rushers**

- SF – Carlos Hyde - 15 rushes, 51 yards
- ARI – Chris Johnson - 22 rushes, 110 yards, 2 TD

**Top receivers**

- SF – Garrett Celek - 3 receptions, 29 yards
- ARI – Larry Fitzgerald - 9 receptions, 134 yards, 2 TD

**Top tacklers**

- SF – NaVorro Bowman - 7 tackles
- ARI – Kevin Minter - 8 tackles

49ers quarterback Colin Kaepernick became the first player since 1925 to throw two interceptions returned for touchdowns (pick sixes) to start a game. He had four interceptions in the game overall and the Cardinals thrashed the 49ers 47–7. This is the most points the Cardinals have ever scored against the 49ers. In the past two weeks, the 49ers were outscored 90–25.

With the loss, the 49ers dropped to 1–2.

==== Week 4: vs. Green Bay Packers ====
Week Four: Green Bay Packers at San Francisco 49ers– Game summary

Quarter	1	2	3	4	Total
**Packers**	7	0	10	0	**17**
49ers	0	3	0	0	**3**

at Levi's Stadium, Santa Clara, California

- Date: October 4
- Game time: 1:25 pm. PDT
- Game weather: 74 °F (23 °C), sunny
- Game attendance: 70,799
- Referee: Terry McAulay
- TV announcers (Fox): Joe Buck, Troy Aikman and Erin Andrews
- Recap, Gamebook

Game information

**First quarter**

- GB – Richard Rodgers 9 Yd pass from Aaron Rodgers (Mason Crosby Kick), 9:02. Packers 7–0. **Drive: 12 plays, 80 yards, 5:58.**

**Second quarter**

- SF – Phil Dawson 33 Yd Field Goal, 4:25. Packers 7–3. **Drive: 12 plays, 57 yards, 6:23.**

**Third quarter**

- GB – John Kuhn 1 Yd Run (Mason Crosby Kick), 7:10. Packers 14–3. **Drive: 9 plays, 61 yards, 4:33.**

**Fourth quarter**

- GB – Mason Crosby 31 Yd Field Goal, 0:45. Packers 17–3. **Drive: 8 plays, 35 yards, 4:38.**

**Top passers**

- GB – Aaron Rodgers – 22–32, 224 YDS, 1 TD
- SF – Colin Kaepernick – 13–25, 160 YDS, 1 INT

**Top rushers**

- GB – Eddie Lacy – 18 CAR, 90 YDS
- SF – Colin Kaepernick – 10 CAR, 57 YDS

**Top receivers**

- GB – James Jones – 5 REC, 98 YDS
- SF – Torrey Smith – 2 REC, 54 YDS

**Top tacklers**

- GB – Ha Ha Clinton-Dix – 7 tackles
- SF – Michael Wilhoite – 9 tackles

Despite a good showing by the 49ers defense (holding the Packers to a season-low 17 points and sacking Aaron Rodgers 3 times), the 49ers offense struggled all game. It was another frustrating day for Colin Kaepernick, who consistently missed receivers and threw an interception. Throughout the game, he was sacked six times. In the last two weeks, Kaepernick had no touchdown passes and five interceptions with a quarterback rating of 12.7.

With yet another tough loss, the 49ers dropped to 1–3, and were outscored by a total of 110–48 in their first 4 games. By the end of week 4, the 49ers were last in the league in total points scored.

==== Week 5: at New York Giants ====
Week Five: San Francisco 49ers at New York Giants– Game summary

Quarter	1	2	3	4	Total
49ers	3	3	7	14	**27**
**Giants**	3	10	7	10	**30**

at MetLife Stadium, East Rutherford, New Jersey

- Date: October 11
- Game time: 8:30 pm. EDT/5:30 pm. PDT
- Game weather: 61 °F (16 °C), clear
- Game attendance: 78,515
- Referee: Walt Coleman
- TV announcers (NBC): Al Michaels, Cris Collinsworth and Michele Tafoya
- Recap, Gamebook

Game information

**First quarter**

- SF – Phil Dawson 43-yard field goal. 11:19. 49ers 3–0. **Drive: 8 plays, 55 yards, 3:41.**
- NYG – Josh Brown 22-yard field goal. 6:22. Tie 3–3. **Drive: 9 plays, 76 yards, 4:57.**

**Second quarter**

- NYG – Shane Vereen 2-yard pass from Eli Manning (Josh Brown kick), 12:15. Giants 10–3. **Drive: 14 plays, 81 yards, 5:47.**
- NYG – Josh Brown 41 yard field goal, 3:57. Giants 13–3. **Drive: 10 plays, 43 yards, 4:05.**
- SF – Phil Dawson 22 yard field goal, 1:01. Giants 13–6. **Drive: 11 plays, 76 yards, 2:56.**

**Third quarter**

- SF – Anquan Boldin 3-yard pass from Colin Kaepernick (Phil Dawson kick), 8:00. Tie 13–13. **Drive: 10 plays, 88 yards, 4:56.**
- NYG – Odell Beckham Jr. 17-yard pass from Eli Manning (Josh Brown kick), 1:14. Giants 20–13. **Drive: 7 plays, 61 yards, 3:16.**

**Fourth quarter**

- SF – Garrett Celek 5-yard pass from Colin Kaepernick (Phil Dawson kick), 11:49. Tie 20–20. **11 plays, 80 yards, 4:25.**
- NYG – Josh Brown 24-yard field goal, 4:29. Giants 23–20. **14 plays, 74 yards, 7:20.**
- SF – Carlos Hyde 2-yard rush (Phil Dawson kick), 1:45. 49ers 27–23. **Drive: 7 plays, 80 yards, 2:44.**
- NYG – Larry Donnell 12-yard pass from Eli Manning, 0:12. Giants 30–27. **Drive: 8 plays, 82 yards, 1:24.**

**Top passers**

- SF – Colin Kaepernick – 23/35, 262 yards, 2 TD, 0 Int.
- NYG – Eli Manning – 41/54, 441 yards, 3 TD, 1 Int

**Top rushers**

- SF – Carlos Hyde – 21 rush, 93 yards, 1 TD
- NYG – Rashad Jennings – 11 rush, 46 yards.

**Top receivers**

- SF – Anquan Boldin – 8 rec, 107 yards, 1 TD
- NYG – Odell Beckham Jr. – 7 rec, 121 yards, 1 TD

**Turnovers**

- SF - 0
- NYG - 1

In one of the wildest games of the year, the 49ers lost a heartbreaker in the final minute. The 49ers offense, which struggled the previous two weeks and had just 6 points at halftime in this game, came alive and scored three-second half touchdowns, including Carlos Hyde's 2-yard go-ahead touchdown run with 1:45 left on the clock to give the 49ers a 27–23 lead. But Giants quarterback Eli Manning led the Giants down the field and threw a 12-yard touchdown to Larry Donnell with 0:17 left in the game. The 49ers defense was shredded for an astonishing 525 yards by the Giants offense. There were five lead changes in the game, three of them in the final 4:29 of the fourth quarter.

With the loss, the 49ers fell to 1–4.

==== Week 6: vs. Baltimore Ravens ====
Week Six: Baltimore Ravens at San Francisco 49ers– Game summary

Quarter	1	2	3	4	Total
Ravens	0	6	7	7	**20**
**49ers**	6	10	3	6	**25**

at Levi's Stadium, Santa Clara, California

- Date: October 18
- Game time: 1:25 pm. PDT
- Game weather: 69 °F (21 °C), partly sunny
- Game attendance: 70,799
- Referee: John Parry
- TV announcers (CBS): Kevin Harlan, Rich Gannon and Jamie Erdahl
- Recap, Gamebook

Game information

**First quarter**

- SF – Phil Dawson 53-yard field goal, 7:00. 49ers 3–0. **Drive: 5 plays, 32 yards, 1:37.**
- SF – Phil Dawson 31-yard field goal, 1:56. 49ers 6–0. **Drive: 8 plays, 74 yards, 3:30.**

**Second quarter**

- BAL – Justin Tucker 22-yard field goal, 13:16. 49ers 6–3. **Drive: 9 plays, 57 yards, 3:40.**
- SF – Colin Kaepernick 76-yard pass to Torrey Smith (Phil Dawson kick), 12:27. 49ers 13–3. **Drive: 2 plays, 80 yards, 0:49.**
- SF – Phil Dawson 26-yard field goal, 8:04. 49ers 16–3. **Drive: 7 plays, 21 yards, 3:31.**
- BAL – Justin Tucker 36-yard field goal, 4:14. 49ers 16–6. **Drive: 9 plays, 62 yards, 3:50.**

**Third quarter**

- SF – Phil Dawson 42-yard field goal, 7:34. 49ers 19–6. **Drive: 7 plays, 14 yards, 3:02.**
- BAL – Joe Flacco 34-yard pass to Steve Smith Sr. (Justin Tucker kick), 2:29. 49ers 19–13. **Drive: 9 plays, 80 yards, 5:05.**

**Fourth quarter**

- SF – Quinton Patton 11-yard pass from Colin Kaepernick (two-point conversion failed), 10:52. 49ers 25–13. **Drive: 5 plays, 65 yards, 2:45.**
- BAL – Kamar Aiken 2-yard pass from Joe Flacco (Justin Tucker kick), 5:14. 49ers 25–20. **Drive: 14 plays, 80 yards, 5:38.**

**Top passers**

- BAL – Joe Flacco – 33/53, 343 yards, 2 TD, 2 INT
- SF – Colin Kaepernick – 16/27, 340 yards, 2 TD, 0 INT

**Top rushers**

- BAL – Justin Forsett – 17 rushes, 62 yards
- SF – Carlos Hyde – 21 rushes, 55 yards

**Top receivers**

- BAL – Steve Smith Sr. – 7 rec, 137 yards, 1 TD
- SF – Anquan Boldin – 5 rec, 102 yards

**Turnovers**

- BAL – 2
- SF – 0

The 49ers met the Ravens for the first time since Super Bowl XLVII, in which the Ravens won 34–31. In the second quarter, Colin Kaepernick threw a 76-yard pass to ex-Raven Torrey Smith to extend San Francisco's lead to 13–3. In the fourth quarter, Kaepernick threw another touchdown, this time to Quinton Patton, for 11 yards to lead the 49ers 25–13. This was Patton's first NFL touchdown. With the win, the 49ers avenged their Super Bowl loss and broke their 4-game losing streak, and they improved to 2–4.

==== Week 7: vs. Seattle Seahawks ====
Week Seven: Seattle Seahawks at San Francisco 49ers– Game summary

Quarter	1	2	3	4	Total
**Seahawks**	7	10	0	3	**20**
49ers	0	0	3	0	**3**

at Levi's Stadium, Santa Clara, California

- Date: October 22
- Game time: 5:25 pm. PDT
- Game weather: 75 °F (24 °C), mostly sunny
- Game attendance: 70,799
- Referee: Walt Anderson
- TV announcers (CBS/NFLN): Jim Nantz, Phil Simms and Tracy Wolfson
- Recap, Gamebook

Game information

**First quarter**

- SEA – Marshawn Lynch 1 Yd Run (Steven Hauschka Kick), 7:01. Seahawks 7–0. **Drive: 12 plays, 61 yards, 6:36.**

**Second quarter**

- SEA – Steven Hauschka 49 Yd Field Goal, 9:37. Seahawks 10–0. **Drive: 6 plays, 35 yards, 3:21.**
- SEA – Tyler Lockett 43 Yd pass from Russell Wilson (Steven Hauschka Kick), 2:44. Seahawks 17–0. **Drive: 5 plays, 90 yards, 2:57.**

**Third quarter**

- SF – Phil Dawson 35 Yd Field Goal, 1:21. Seahawks 17–3. **Drive: 10 plays, 76 yards, 5:03.**

**Fourth quarter**

- SEA – Steven Hauschka 46 Yd Field Goal, 9:23. Seahawks 20–3. **Drive: 12 plays, 49 yards, 6:58.**

**Top passers**

- SEA – Russell Wilson – 18–24, 235 YDS, 1 TD, 2 INT
- SF – Colin Kaepernick – 13–24, 124 YDS

**Top rushers**

- SEA – Marshawn Lynch – 27 CAR, 122 YDS, 1 TD
- SF – Carlos Hyde – 11 CAR, 40 YDS

**Top receivers**

- SEA – Tyler Lockett – 5 REC, 79 YDS, 1 TD
- SF – Vernon Davis – 4 REC, 61 YDS

**Top tacklers**

- SEA – Earl Thomas – 7 tackles
- SF – Michael Wilhoite – 13 tackles

Much like last year's Thanksgiving Day matchup, the 49ers were unable to stop the defending NFC Champion Seattle Seahawks. Colin Kaepernick struggled all game long and he was sacked six times, much like Week 4 against Green Bay, where the 49ers were also only held to a field goal. With the 20–3 loss, the 49ers dropped to 2–5.

==== Week 8: at St. Louis Rams ====
Week Eight: San Francisco 49ers at St. Louis Rams– Game summary

Quarter	1	2	3	4	Total
49ers	3	3	0	0	**6**
**Rams**	2	18	0	7	**27**

at Edward Jones Dome, St. Louis, Missouri

- Date: November 1
- Game time: 12:00 p.m. CST/10:00 am. PST
- Game weather: Played indoors (dome stadium)
- Game attendance: 51,207
- Referee: Jerome Boger
- TV announcers (Fox): Dick Stockton, David Diehl and Kristina Pink
- Recap, Gamebook

Game information

**First quarter**

- SF – Phil Dawson 54 Yd Field Goal, 10:29. 49ers 3–0. **Drive: 9 plays, 44 yards, 4:31.**
- STL – James Laurinaitis Safety, 4:24. 49ers 3–2. **Drive: 3 plays, -3 yards, 1:08.**

**Second quarter**

- STL – Todd Gurley 71 Yd Run (Nick Foles–Jared Cook pass), 10:25. Rams 10–3. **Drive: 1 play, 71 yards, 0:10.**
- STL – Greg Zuerlein 38 Yd Field Goal, 6:52. Rams 13–3. **Drive: 6 plays, 19 yards, 2:13.**
- SF – Phil Dawson 26 Yd Field Goal, 1:53. Rams 13–6. **Drive: 12 plays, 73 yards, 4:59.**
- STL – Tavon Austin 2 Yd Run (Greg Zuerlein Kick), 0:18. Rams 20–6. **Drive: 7 plays, 80 yards, 1:35.**

**Third quarter**

- No scoring plays.

**Fourth quarter**

- STL – Tavon Austin 66 Yd pass from Nick Foles (Greg Zuerlein Kick), 8:34. Rams 27–6. **Drive: 3 plays, 73 yards, 1:35.**

**Top passers**

- SF – Colin Kaepernick – 20–41, 162 YDS
- STL – Nick Foles – 14–23, 191 YDS, 1 TD

**Top rushers**

- SF – Colin Kaepernick – 6 CAR, 28 YDS
- STL – Todd Gurley – 20 CAR, 133 YDS, 1 TD

**Top receivers**

- SF – Jerome Simpson – 3 REC, 34 YDS
- STL – Tavon Austin – 4 REC, 98 YDS, 1 TD

**Top tacklers**

- SF – NaVorro Bowman – 10 tackles
- STL – Mark Barron – 10 tackles

With the loss, San Francisco fell to 2–6.

==== Week 9: vs. Atlanta Falcons ====
Week Nine: Atlanta Falcons at San Francisco 49ers– Game summary

Quarter	1	2	3	4	Total
Falcons	3	10	0	3	**16**
**49ers**	0	17	0	0	**17**

at Levi's Stadium, Santa Clara, California

- Date: November 8
- Game time: 1:05 pm. PST
- Game weather: 58 °F (14 °C), cloudy
- Game attendance: 70,799
- Referee: Tony Corrente
- TV announcers (Fox): Chris Myers, Ronde Barber and Jennifer Hale
- Recap, Gamebook

Game information

**First quarter**

- ATL – Matt Bryant 44 Yd Field Goal, 9:24. Falcons 3–0. **Drive: 9 plays, 46 yards, 3:38.**

**Second quarter**

- SF – Garrett Celek 1 Yd pass from Blaine Gabbert (Phil Dawson Kick), 13:41. 49ers 7–3. **Drive: 12 plays, 84 yards, 6:26.**
- ATL – Matt Bryant 36 Yd Field Goal, 6:05. 49ers 7–6. **Drive: 5 plays, 27 yards, 1:28.**
- SF – Phil Dawson 44 Yd Field Goal, 3:20. 49ers 10–6. **Drive: 9 plays, 41 yards, 2:45.**
- SF – Garrett Celek 11 Yd pass from Blaine Gabbert (Phil Dawson Kick), 1:16. 49ers 17–6. **Drive: 5 plays, 57 yards, 1:09.**
- ATL – Devonta Freeman 17 Yd pass from Matt Ryan (Matt Bryant Kick), 0:13. 49ers 17–13. **Drive: 3 plays, 78 yards, 1:03.**

**Third quarter**

- No scoring plays.

**Fourth quarter**

- ATL – Matt Bryant 19 Yd Field Goal, 2:56. 49ers 17–16. **Drive: 10 plays, 66 yards, 4:18.**

**Top passers**

- ATL – Matt Ryan – 30–45, 303 YDS, 1 TD
- SF – Blaine Gabbert – 15–25, 185 YDS, 2 TD, 2 INT

**Top rushers**

- ATL – Devonta Freeman – 12 CAR, 12 YDS
- SF – Shaun Draughn – 16 CAR, 58 YDS

**Top receivers**

- ATL – Julio Jones – 10 REC, 137 YDS
- SF – Quinton Patton – 3 REC, 70 YDS

**Top tacklers**

- ATL – Philip Wheeler – 10 tackles
- SF – Marcus Cromartie – 7 tackles

This was Blaine Gabbert's first game as starting quarterback with the 49ers, replacing Colin Kaepernick. The 49ers were also without tight end Vernon Davis, who was traded to the Denver Broncos, after nine and a half seasons with the team.

With the win, the 49ers improved to 3–6.

==== Week 11: at Seattle Seahawks ====
Week Eleven: San Francisco 49ers at Seattle Seahawks– Game summary

Quarter	1	2	3	4	Total
49ers	0	7	6	0	**13**
**Seahawks**	13	7	3	6	**29**

at CenturyLink Field, Seattle, Washington

- Date: November 22
- Game time: 1:25 pm. PST
- Game weather: 46 °F (8 °C), sunny
- Game attendance: 68,993
- Referee: Ed Hochuli
- TV announcers (Fox): Chris Myers, Ronde Barber and Jennifer Hale
- Recap, Gamebook

Game information

**First quarter**

- SEA – Tyler Lockett 24 Yd pass from Russell Wilson (Steven Hauschka Kick), 9:55. Seahawks 7–0. **Drive: 6 plays, 61 yards, 2:58.**
- SEA – Thomas Rawls 2 Yd Run (Kick Failed), 3:04. Seahawks 13–0. **Drive: 11 plays, 59 yards, 5:25.**

**Second quarter**

- SEA – Tyler Lockett 11 Yd pass from Russell Wilson (Steven Hauschka Kick), 7:15. Seahawks 20–0. **Drive: 13 plays, 91 yards, 7:37.**
- SF – Vance McDonald 19 Yd pass from Blaine Gabbert (Phil Dawson Kick), 0:09. Seahawks 20–7. **Drive: 9 plays, 92 yards, 1:31.**

**Third quarter**

- SF – Phil Dawson 27 Yd Field Goal, 9:44. Seahawks 20–10. **Drive: 8 plays, 56 yards, 3:27.**
- SEA – Steven Hauschka 33 Yd Field Goal, 5:01. Seahawks 23–10. **Drive: 9 plays, 65 yards, 4:43.**
- SF – Phil Dawson 25 Yd Field Goal, 0:07. Seahawks 23–13. **Drive: 10 plays, 64 yards, 4:54.**

**Fourth quarter**

- SEA – Thomas Rawls 31 Yd pass from Russell Wilson (Kick Blocked), 12:32. Seahawks 29–13. **Drive: 7 plays, 80 yards, 2:35.**

**Top passers**

- SF – Blaine Gabbert – 22–34, 264 YDS, 1 TD
- SEA – Russell Wilson – 24–29, 260 YDS, 3 TD

**Top rushers**

- SF – Shaun Draughn – 12 CAR, 37 YDS
- SEA – Thomas Rawls – 30 CAR, 209 YDS, 1 TD

**Top receivers**

- SF – Anquan Boldin – 5 REC, 93 YDS
- SEA – Doug Baldwin – 6 REC, 60 YDS

**Top tacklers**

- SF – Eric Reid, 10 tackles
- SEA – Bobby Wagner, 8 tackles

Blaine Gabbert made his second start and remained starter for the rest of the season with Colin Kaepernick undergoing season-ending surgery on his left non-throwing shoulder.

After the loss, the 49ers fell to 3–7.

==== Week 12: vs. Arizona Cardinals ====
Week Twelve: Arizona Cardinals at San Francisco 49ers– Game summary

Quarter	1	2	3	4	Total
**Cardinals**	3	3	7	6	**19**
49ers	0	3	10	0	**13**

at Levi's Stadium, Santa Clara, California

- Date: November 29
- Game time: 1:05 pm. PST
- Game weather: 54 °F (12 °C), sunny
- Game attendance: 70,799
- Referee: Pete Morelli
- TV announcers (Fox): Chris Myers, Ronde Barber and Jennifer Hale
- Recap, Gamebook

Game information

**First quarter**

- ARI – Chandler Catanzaro 26 Yd Field Goal, 4:00. Cardinals 3–0. **Drive: 8 plays, 31 yards, 3:28.**

**Second quarter**

- ARI – Chandler Catanzaro 41 Yd Field Goal, 12:43. Cardinals 6–0. **Drive: 9 plays, 19 yards, 4:12.**
- SF – Phil Dawson 53 Yd Field Goal, 0:00. Cardinals 6–3. **Drive: 12 plays, 45 yards, 3:42.**

**Third quarter**

- ARI – David Johnson 1 Yd Run (Chandler Catanzaro Kick), 9:58. Cardinals 13–3. **Drive: 9 plays, 76 yards, 5:02.**
- SF – Vance McDonald 8 Yd pass from Blaine Gabbert (Phil Dawson Kick), 7:34. Cardinals 13–10. **Drive: 6 plays, 77 yards, 2:24.**
- SF – Phil Dawson 33 Yd Field Goal, 1:28. Tied 13–13. **Drive: 7 plays, 65 yards, 4:10.**

**Fourth quarter**

- ARI – Carson Palmer 7 Yd Run (Kick Failed). Cardinals 19–13. **Drive: 14 plays, 85 yards, 7:57.**

**Top passers**

- ARI – Carson Palmer – 24–40, 271 YDS
- SF – Blaine Gabbert – 25–36, 318 YDS, 1 TD, 1 INT

**Top rushers**

- ARI – Andre Ellington – 5 CAR, 24 YDS
- SF – Shaun Draughn – 15 CAR, 51 YDS

**Top receivers**

- ARI – John Brown – 5 REC, 99 YDS
- SF – Anquan Boldin – 8 REC, 93 YDS

**Top tacklers**

- ARI – Tyrann Mathieu – 13 tackles
- SF – NaVorro Bowman – 8 tackles

With the loss, the 49ers fell to 3-8 and were swept by the Cardinals for the first time since 2008.

==== Week 13: at Chicago Bears ====
Week Thirteen: San Francisco 49ers at Chicago Bears– Game summary

Quarter	1	2	3	4	OT	Total
**49ers**	6	7	0	7	6	**26**
Bears	6	7	0	7	0	**20**

at Soldier Field, Chicago, Illinois

- Date: December 6
- Game time: 12:00 pm. CST/10:00 am. PST
- Game weather: 50 °F (10 °C), sunny
- Game attendance: 62,088
- Referee: Jerome Boger
- TV announcers (Fox): Kenny Albert, Daryl Johnston and Laura Okmin
- Recap, Gamebook

Game information

**First quarter**

- CHI – Robbie Gould 40 Yd Field Goal, 10:17. Bears 3–0. **Drive: 7 plays, 19 yards, 3:25.**
- CHI – Robbie Gould 51 Yd Field Goal, 5:59. Bears 6–0. **Drive: 6 plays, 20 yards, 2:52.**
- SF – Jimmie Ward 29 Yd Interception Return (Kick Blocked), 2:49. Tied 6–6. **Drive: 2 plays, 1 yard, 0:54.**

**Second quarter**

- CHI – Matt Forte 5 Yd Run (Robbie Gould Kick), 13:37. Bears 13–6. **Drive: 8 plays, 80 yards, 4:12.**
- SF – Shaun Draughn 1 Yd Run (Phil Dawson Kick), 6:53. Tied 13–13. **Drive: 16 plays, 81 yards, 6:44.**

**Third quarter**

- No scoring plays.

**Fourth quarter**

- CHI – Ka'Deem Carey 4 Yd Run (Robbie Gould Kick), 3:32. Bears 20–13. **Drive: 6 plays, 83 yards, 3:53.**
- SF – Blaine Gabbert 44 Yd Run (Phil Dawson Kick), 1:42. Tied 20–20. **Drive: 6 plays, 64 yards, 1:50.**

**Overtime**

- SF – Torrey Smith 71-yard pass from Blaine Gabbert, 12:50. 49ers 26–20. **Drive: 1 play, 71 yards, 0:11.**

**Top passers**

- SF – Blaine Gabbert – 18–32, 196 YDS, 1 TD
- CHI – Jay Cutler – 18–31, 202 YDS, 1 INT

**Top rushers**

- SF – Blaine Gabbert – 6 CAR, 75 YDS, 1 TD
- CHI – Matt Forte – 21 CAR, 84 YDS, 1 TD

**Top receivers**

- SF – Torrey Smith – 2 REC, 76 YDS, 1 TD
- CHI – Alshon Jeffery – 4 REC, 85 YDS

**Top tacklers**

- SF – NaVorro Bowman – 14 tackles
- CHI – Shea McClellin – 9 tackles

The 49ers would trail 20–13 with less than a minute to go. Blaine Gabbert would run in a game-tying 44-yard touchdown to tie the game at 20. However, the Bears appeared to have the game won when they went down the field after a 74-yard kick return by Deonte Thompson. But when Robbie Gould came out to attempt a game-winning 36-yard field goal, the kick was wide left, resulting in overtime. In the overtime period, Gabbert would throw the game-winning 71-yard touchdown pass to Torrey Smith to win the game for San Francisco. This was San Francisco's first win in Chicago since the 1988 NFC Championship Game and first regular season win at Soldier field since 1974, having lost their previous 6 regular season trips to the Windy City.

With the win, the 49ers went to 4–8.

==== Week 14: at Cleveland Browns ====
Week Fourteen: San Francisco 49ers at Cleveland Browns– Game summary

Quarter	1	2	3	4	Total
49ers	0	3	0	7	**10**
**Browns**	7	3	7	7	**24**

at FirstEnergy Stadium, Cleveland, Ohio

- Date: December 13
- Game time: 1:00 pm. EST/10:00 am. PST
- Game weather: 63 °F (17 °C), overcast
- Game attendance: 63,916
- Referee: John Hussey
- TV announcers (Fox): Joe Davis, Brady Quinn and Peter Schrager
- Recap, Gamebook

Game information

**First quarter**

- CLE – Isaiah Crowell 1-yard run (Travis Coons kick), 5:40. Browns 7–0. **Drive: 6 plays, 84 yards, 3:27.**

**Second quarter**

- CLE – Travis Coons 26-yard field goal, 9:06. Browns 10–0. **Drive: 10 plays, 56 yards, 5:52.**
- SF – Phil Dawson 44-yard field goal, 4:16. Browns 10–3. **Drive: 4 plays, 6 yards, 1:30.**

**Third quarter**

- CLE – Gary Barnidge 2-yard pass from Johnny Manziel (Travis Coons kick), 0:17. Browns 17–3. **Drive: 8 plays, 78 yards, 4:15.**

**Fourth quarter**

- CLE – Isaiah Crowell 3-yard run (Travis Coons kick), 8:53. Browns 24–3. **Drive: 9 plays, 91 yards, 4:47.**
- SF – Jerome Simpson 6-yard pass from Blaine Gabbert (Phil Dawson kick), 1:48. Browns 24–10. **Drive: 8 plays, 94 yards, 1:40.**

**Top passers**

- SF – Blaine Gabbert – 18/28, 194 yards, TD
- CLE – Johnny Manziel – 21/31, 270 yards, TD, INT

**Top rushers**

- SF – Shaun Draughn – 11 rushes, 43 yards
- CLE – Isaiah Crowell – 20 rushes, 145 yards, 2 TD

**Top receivers**

- SF – Blake Bell – 3 receptions, 49 yards
- CLE – Brian Hartline – 8 receptions, 107 yards

**Top tacklers**

- SF – Kenneth Acker – 8 tackles, 3 assists
- CLE – Armonty Bryant – 7 tackles (2 sacks)

With the loss, the 49ers were eliminated from the playoffs and became the latest Super Bowl host team to fail to play the championship game on its own home field.

==== Week 15: vs. Cincinnati Bengals ====
Week Fifteen: Cincinnati Bengals at San Francisco 49ers– Game summary

Quarter	1	2	3	4	Total
**Bengals**	0	21	3	0	**24**
49ers	0	0	7	7	**14**

at Levi's Stadium, Santa Clara, California

- Date: December 20
- Game time: 1:25 pm. PST
- Game weather: 52 °F (11 °C), cloudy
- Game attendance: 70,799
- Referee: Ron Torbert
- TV announcers (CBS): Spero Dedes, Solomon Wilcots and Jay Feely
- Recap, Gamebook

Game information

**First quarter**

- CIN – Jeremy Hill 1 Yd Run (Mike Nugent Kick), 5:16. Bengals 7–0. **Drive: 5 plays, 11 yards, 2:45.**
- CIN – Jeremy Hill 1 Yd Run (Mike Nugent Kick), 1:17. Bengals 14–0. **Drive: 5 plays, 36 yards, 2:05.**
- CIN – Tyler Kroft 20 Yd pass from A. J. McCarron (Mike Nugent Kick), 0:53. Bengals 21–0. **Drive: 1 play, 20 yards, 0:05.**

**Second quarter**

- No scoring plays.

**Third quarter**

- CIN – Mike Nugent 22 Yd Field Goal, 8:40. Bengals 24–0. **Drive: 13 plays, 70 yards, 6:20.**
- SF – Bruce Miller 1 Yd Run (Phil Dawson Kick), 3:14. Bengals 24–7. **Drive: 5 plays, 46 yards, 1:36.**

**Fourth quarter**

- SF – Anquan Boldin 15 Yd pass from Blaine Gabbert (Phil Dawson Kick), 2:17. Bengals 24–14. **Drive: 11 plays, 72 yards, 3:53.**

**Top passers**

- CIN – A. J. McCarron – 15–21, 192 YDS, 1 TD
- SF – Blaine Gabbert – 30–50, 295 YDS, 1 TD, 3 INT

**Top rushers**

- CIN – Giovani Bernard – 14 CAR, 33 YDS
- SF – Shaun Draughn – 9 CAR, 38 YDS

**Top receivers**

- CIN – Marvin Jones Jr. – 4 REC, 89 YDS
- SF – Anquan Boldin – 8 REC, 74 YDS, 1 TD

**Top tacklers**

- CIN – Rey Maualuga – 10 tackles
- SF – NaVorro Bowman – 11 tackles

The 49ers fell behind 21-0 in the first quarter and never recovered as they lost 24–14 to the Cincinnati Bengals. The offense particularly played poorly as quarterback Blaine Gabbert threw 3 interceptions and receiver Anquan Boldin lost a fumble.

With the loss, the 49ers fell to 4–10.

==== Week 16: at Detroit Lions ====
Week Sixteen: San Francisco 49ers at Detroit Lions– Game summary

Quarter	1	2	3	4	Total
49ers	7	10	0	0	**17**
**Lions**	3	17	3	9	**32**

at Ford Field, Detroit, Michigan

- Date: December 27
- Game time: 1:00 pm. EST/10:00 am. PST
- Game weather: Played indoors (dome stadium)
- Game attendance: 61,313
- Referee: Bill Vinovich
- TV announcers (Fox): Thom Brennaman, Charles Davis and Tony Siragusa
- Recap, Gamebook

Game information

**First quarter**

- SF – Vance McDonald 1 Yd pass from Blaine Gabbert (Phil Dawson Kick), 9:24. 49ers 7–0. **Drive: 11 plays, 80 yards, 5:36.**
- DET – Matt Prater 36 Yd Field Goal, 5:19. 49ers 7–3. **Drive: 8 plays, 44 yards, 4:05.**

**Second quarter**

- DET – T. J. Jones 29 Yd pass from Matthew Stafford (Matt Prater Kick), 14:15. Lions 10–7. **Drive: 9 plays, 74 yards, 4:39.**
- SF – Torrey Smith 16 Yd pass from Blaine Gabbert (Phil Dawson Kick), 11:26. 49ers 14–10. **Drive: 7 plays, 82 yards, 2:49.**
- DET – Joique Bell 1 Yd Run (Matt Prater Kick), 8:54. Lions 17–14. **Drive: 1 play, 1 yard, 0:03.**
- SF – Phil Dawson 40 Yd Field Goal, 0:35. Tied 17–17. **Drive: 9 plays, 68 yards, 2:06.**
- DET – Matt Prater 38 Yd Field Goal, 0:00. Lions 20–17. **Drive: 4 plays, 60 yards, 0:35.**

**Third quarter**

- DET – Matt Prater 37 Yd Field Goal, 8:25. Lions 23–17. **Drive: 11 plays, 64 yards, 6:35.**

**Fourth quarter**

- DET – Calvin Johnson 1 Yd pass from Matthew Stafford (Two-Point Conversion Failed), 9:04. Lions 29–17. **Drive: 13 plays, 67 yards, 7:27.**
- DET – Matt Prater 34 Yd Field Goal, 3:07. Lions 32–17. **Drive: 9 plays, 24 yards, 3:43.**

**Top passers**

- SF – Blaine Gabbert – 22–33, 225 YDS, 2 TD
- DET – Matthew Stafford – 29–37, 301 YDS, 2 TD

**Top rushers**

- SF – DuJuan Harris – 11 CAR, 73 YDS
- DET – Ameer Abdullah – 8 CAR, 39 YDS

**Top receivers**

- SF – Vance McDonald – 5 REC, 61 YDS, 1 TD
- DET – Calvin Johnson – 6 REC, 77 YDS, 1 TD

**Top tacklers**

- SF – NaVorro Bowman, 10 tackles
- DET – Darius Slay, 6 tackles

With the loss, the 49ers' nine-game winning streak against the Detroit Lions came to an end, as they were defeated by the Lions for the first time since the 1995 season.

==== Week 17: vs. St. Louis Rams ====
Week Seventeen: St. Louis Rams at San Francisco 49ers– Game summary

Quarter	1	2	3	4	OT	Total
Rams	3	13	0	0	0	**16**
**49ers**	0	10	3	3	3	**19**

at Levi's Stadium, Santa Clara, California

- Date: January 3, 2016
- Game time: 1:25 pm. PST
- Game weather: 53 °F (12 °C), partly cloudy
- Game attendance: 70,799
- Referee: Walt Coleman
- TV announcers (CBS): Tom McCarthy and Adam Archuleta
- Recap, Gamebook

Game information

**First quarter**

- STL – Greg Zuerlein 33 Yd Field Goal, 8:11. Rams 3–0. **Drive: 6 plays, 72 yards, 2:15.**

**Second quarter**

- SF – Anquan Boldin 33 Yd pass from Blaine Gabbert (Phil Dawson Kick), 14:52. 49ers 7–3. **Drive: 7 plays, 70 yards, 3:27.**
- SF – Phil Dawson 26 Yd Field Goal, 9:03. 49ers 10–3. **Drive: 7 plays, 55 yards, 2:16.**
- STL – Greg Zuerlein 32 Yd Field Goal, 2:43. 49ers 10–6. **Drive: 12 plays, 66 yards, 6:20.**
- STL – Tre Mason 4 Yd Run (Greg Zuerlein Kick), 1:31. Rams 13–10. **Drive: 2 plays, 3 yards, 0:16.**
- STL – Greg Zuerlein 44 Yd Field Goal, 0:04. Rams 16–10. **Drive: 4 plays, 40 yards, 0:25.**

**Third quarter**

- SF – Phil Dawson 28 Yd Field Goal, 9:37. Rams 16–13. **Drive: 12 plays, 70 yards, 5:23.**

**Fourth quarter**

- SF – Phil Dawson 38 Yd Field Goal, 4:28. Tied 16–16. **Drive: 12 plays, 60 yards, 5:53.**

**Overtime**

- SF – Phil Dawson 23 Yd Field Goal, 3:27. 49ers 19–16. **Drive: 5 plays, 69 yards, 1:22.**

**Top passers**

- STL – Case Keenum – 22–37, 231 YDS
- SF – Blaine Gabbert – 28–44, 354 YDS, 1 TD, 1 INT

**Top rushers**

- STL – Tre Mason – 18 CAR, 44 YDS, 1 TD
- SF – DuJuan Harris – 16 CAR, 67 YDS

**Top receivers**

- STL – Kenny Britt – 3 REC, 81 YDS
- SF – DuJuan Harris – 8 REC, 86 YDS

**Top tacklers**

- STL – Trumaine Johnson – 10 tackles
- SF – Gerald Hodges – 13 tackles

This was the final game between the San Francisco 49ers and the St. Louis Rams before the Rams' relocation to Los Angeles. With the win, the 49ers ended their season 5–11.

== Standings ==
=== Division ===
NFC West
	W	L	T	PCT	DIV	CONF	PF	PA	STK
^{(2)} Arizona Cardinals	13	3	0	.813	4–2	10–2	489	313	L1
^{(6)} Seattle Seahawks	10	6	0	.625	3–3	7–5	423	277	W1
St. Louis Rams	7	9	0	.438	4–2	6–6	280	330	L1
San Francisco 49ers	5	11	0	.313	1–5	4–8	238	387	W1

=== Conference ===
NFC
#	Team	Division	W	L	T	PCT	DIV	CONF	SOS	SOV	STK
Division Leaders
1	Carolina Panthers	South	15	1	0	.938	5–1	11–1	.441	.438	W1
2	Arizona Cardinals	West	13	3	0	.813	4–2	10–2	.477	.457	L1
3	Minnesota Vikings	North	11	5	0	.688	5–1	8–4	.504	.449	W3
4	Washington Redskins	East	9	7	0	.563	4–2	8–4	.465	.403	W4
Wild Cards
5 (Note: Green Bay finished ahead of Seattle based on head-to-head victory.)	Green Bay Packers	North	10	6	0	.625	3–3	7–5	.531	.450	L2
6	Seattle Seahawks	West	10	6	0	.625	3–3	7–5	.520	.431	W1
Did not qualify for the postseason
7	Atlanta Falcons	South	8	8	0	.500	1–5	5–7	.480	.453	L1
8 (Note: St. Louis and Detroit finished ahead of Philadelphia and New Orleans based on conference record. St. Louis finished ahead of Detroit based on head-to-head victory. Detroit finished ahead of Philadelphia and New Orleans based on head-to-head sweep, while Philadelphia finished ahead of New Orleans based on head-to-head victory.)	St. Louis Rams	West	7	9	0	.438	4–2	6–6	.527	.482	L1
9	Detroit Lions	North	7	9	0	.438	3–3	6–6	.535	.429	W3
10	Philadelphia Eagles	East	7	9	0	.438	3–3	4–8	.508	.473	W1
11	New Orleans Saints	South	7	9	0	.438	3–3	5–7	.504	.402	W2
12 (Note: The New York Giants and Chicago each finished ahead of Tampa Bay based on head-to-head victory, while the Giants finished ahead of Chicago based on conference record.)	New York Giants	East	6	10	0	.375	2–4	4–8	.500	.396	L3
13	Chicago Bears	North	6	10	0	.375	1–5	3–9	.547	.469	L1
14	Tampa Bay Buccaneers	South	6	10	0	.375	3–3	5–7	.484	.406	L4
15	San Francisco 49ers	West	5	11	0	.313	1–5	4–8	.539	.463	W1
16	Dallas Cowboys	East	4	12	0	.250	3–3	3–9	.531	.438	L4
Tiebreakers (Note: When breaking ties for three or more teams under the NFL's rules, they are first broken within divisions, then comparing only the highest-ranked remaining team from each division.)
