= Jaquiski Tartt =

American football player (born 1992)

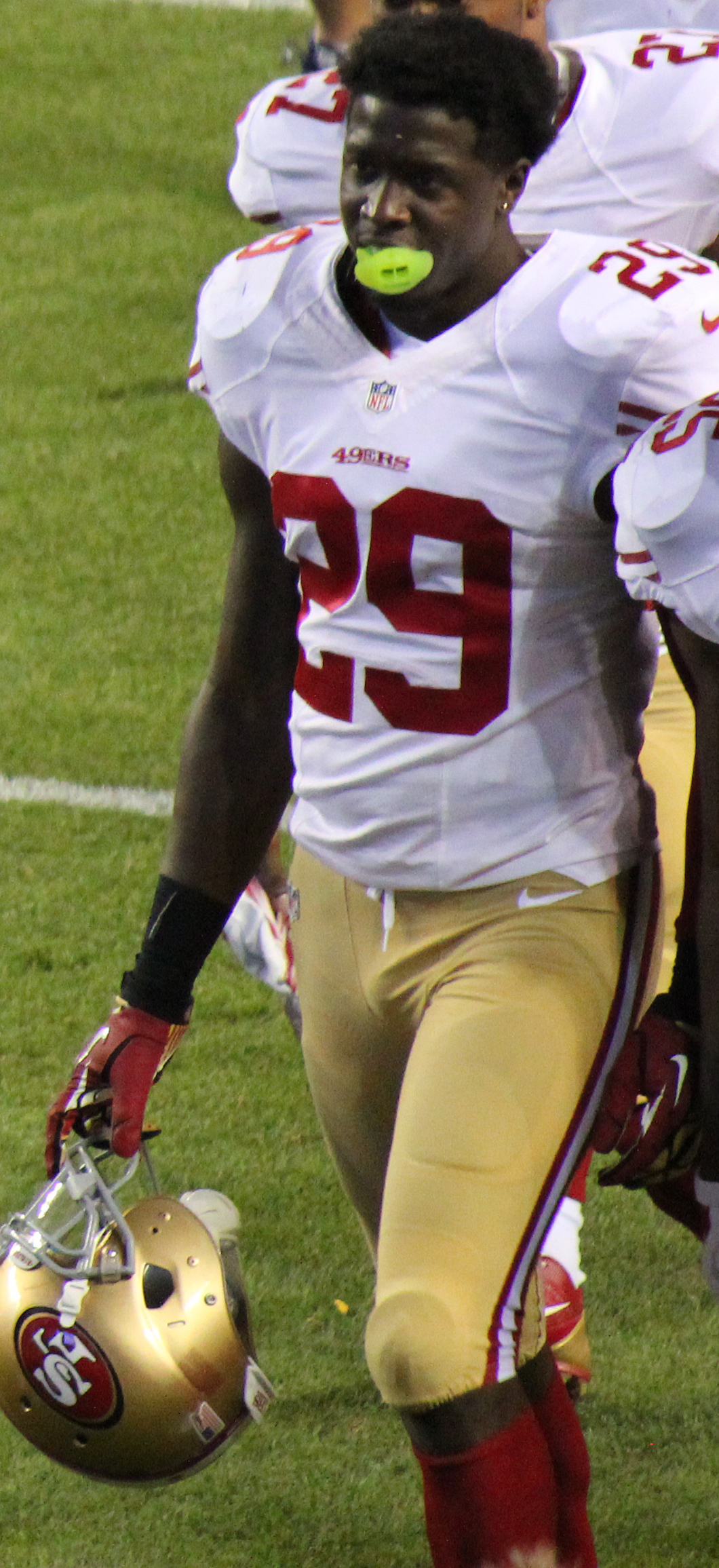
- Tartt with the San Francisco 49ers in 2015

No. 29, 26, 3
- Position: Safety

Personal information
- Born: February 18, 1992 (age 34); Mobile, Alabama, U.S.
- Listed height: 6 ft 1 in (1.85 m)
- Listed weight: 215 lb (98 kg)

Career information
- High school: Davidson (Mobile)
- College: Samford (2010–2014)
- NFL draft: 2015: 2nd round, 46th overall pick

Career history
- San Francisco 49ers (2015–2021); Philadelphia Eagles (2022)*
- * Offseason or practice squad member only

Career NFL statistics
- Total tackles: 367
- Sacks: 4.0
- Forced fumbles: 2
- Fumble recoveries: 2
- Interceptions: 4
- Stats at Pro Football Reference

Jaquiski Tartt (/dʒəˈkwɑːski/ jə-KWAH-skee; born February 18, 1992) is an American former professional football player who was a safety in the National Football League (NFL). He played college football for the Samford Bulldogs and was selected by the San Francisco 49ers in the second round of the 2015 NFL draft.

== Early life ==
Tartt attended Davidson High School in Mobile, Alabama. Tartt played basketball in high school and did not start playing football until his senior season. Despite playing football for one season, he committed to Samford University to play college football.

== College career ==
Tartt attended Samford from 2010 to 2014. After redshirting as a freshman, he saw his first action in 2011. As a redshirt sophomore in 2012, he became a starter and remained throughout his senior season. For his career, he had 277 tackles and six interceptions.

== Professional career ==
=== Pre-draft ===
On November 10, 2014, it was announced that Tartt had accepted his invitation to the 2015 Senior Bowl. On January 24, 2015, Tartt played in the 2015 Reese's Senior Bowl and recorded three tackles and made one tackle for a loss as part of Gus Bradley's South team that lost 34–13 to the North. His appearance made him the first player from Samford to play in Senior Bowl. Tartt attended the NFL Scouting Combine held at Lucas Oil Stadium in Indianapolis, Indiana, but chose to only perform the 40-yard dash, 20-yard dash, 10-yard dash, and broad jump partially due to a hand injury. He finished ninth among all participating defensive backs in the broad jump and 19th in the 40-yard dash. On March 10, 2015, Tartt attended Samford's pro day and performed all of the combine drills and ran positional drills. He fared well at his pro day and attracted representatives and scouts from 18 NFL teams as the primary prospect working out at the event. At the conclusion of the pre-draft process, Tartt was projected to be a second or third round pick by NFL draft experts and scouts. He was ranked the second best strong safety in the draft by DraftScout.com, was ranked the third best safety in the draft by NFL analyst Mike Mayock, was ranked the fourth best safety by Sports Illustrated, and was ranked the sixth best safety prospect in the draft by NFL analyst Charles Davis.

External videos
- Jaquiski Tartt's NFL Combine Workout

Pre-draft measurables
Height	Weight	Arm length	Hand span	40-yard dash	10-yard split	20-yard split	20-yard shuttle	Three-cone drill	Vertical jump	Broad jump	Bench press
6 ft 1 3/8 in (1.86 m)	221 lb (100 kg)	32 3/8 in (0.82 m)	9 7/8 in (0.25 m)	4.53 s	1.61 s	2.67 s	4.30 s	7.08 s	33 in (0.84 m)	10 ft 4 in (3.15 m)	13 reps
All values from NFL Combine

=== San Francisco 49ers ===
==== 2015 ====
The San Francisco 49ers selected Tartt in the second round with the 46th overall pick in the 2015 NFL draft. Tartt was the third safety drafted in 2015, behind Arizona State's Damarious Randall and Alabama's Landon Collins. The selection made Tartt the highest drafted Samford player in school history. Upon joining the 49ers, Tartt reunited with former high school teammate Jimmie Ward.

External videos
- 49ers draft Jaquiski Tartt's 46th overall

On May 1, 2015, the 49ers signed Tartt to a four-year, $5.03 million contract that includes $2.58 million guaranteed and a signing bonus of $1.92 million.

Tartt entered training camp slated as a backup safety and was expected to primarily play in special teams and appear minimally as a backup on defense. Head coach Jim Tomsula named Tartt the backup strong safety to begin the regular season, behind veteran Antoine Bethea.

He made his professional regular season debut in the 49ers' season-opener against the Minnesota Vikings and recorded four solo tackles and made his first career sack in their 20–3 victory. He sacked quarterback Teddy Bridgewater for a 14-yard loss in the first quarter and made his first career tackle on running back Matt Asiata in the second quarter. On October 22, 2015, Tartt collected a season-high nine combined tackles during a 20–3 loss to the Seattle Seahawks in Week 7. During the first seven games, Tartt was used primarily in dime packages and on special teams. On November 1, 2015, Tartt earned his first career start in place of Antoine Bethea in Week 8. Defensive coordinator Eric Mangini named Tartt the starter after Bethea tore his pectoral muscle the previous week and missed the remainder of the season. Tartt finished the 49ers' 27–6 loss at the St. Louis Rams with six combined tackles. The following week, he made a season-high two pass deflections and four tackles in the 49ers' 17–16 win against the Atlanta Falcons in Week 9. On December 13, 2015, Tartt collected eight combined tackles, deflected a pass, and made his first career interception during a 24–10 loss at the Cleveland Browns in Week 14. His interception occurred in the second quarter off a pass attempt by rookie quarterback Johnny Manziel. Tartt was inactive for the 49ers' Week 17 win against the St. Louis Rams due to a knee injury. He finished his rookie season with 65 combined tackles (52 solo), three passes defensed, two sacks, and an interception in 15 games and eight starts.

==== 2016 ====
On January 3, 2016, the 49ers fired Tomsula after finishing with a 5–11 record in 2015. Throughout training camp, Tartt competed against Antoine Bethea to be the starting strong safety. Head coach Chip Kelly named Tartt the backup strong safety behind Antoine Bethea to start the regular season in 2016.

He was sidelined for the 49ers' Week 6 loss to the Buffalo Bills after injuring his quadriceps the previous week. On November 27, 2016, Tartt made his first start at free safety and recorded three combined tackles in their 31–24 loss at the Miami Dolphins in Week 12. He earned the starting role for the rest of the season after the 49ers placed Eric Reid on injured reserve after he tore his bicep in his right arm. In Week 14, he collected a career-high 12 combined tackles (ten solo) and a sack during a 23–17 loss to the New York Jets. Tartt finished the 2016 season with 61 combined tackles (47 solo), three pass deflections, and a sack in 15 games and six starts.

==== 2017 ====
On January 2, 2017, the 49ers fired Kelly after the 49ers finished with a 2–14 record in 2016. Defensive coordinator Jim O'Neil held a competition between Tartt and Eric Reid to name a new starting strong safety after Antoine Bethea was granted his release. Head coach Kyle Shanahan named Tartt the backup strong safety to begin the regular season, behind Eric Reid.

He started in the 49ers' season-opener against the Carolina Panthers and recorded a season-high seven solo tackles, a pass deflection, and intercepted a pass by quarterback Cam Newton in the second quarter of their 23–3 loss. Tartt started the first two regular season games at free safety in place of Jimmie Ward who was inactive due to a hamstring injury. The following week, he was named the starting strong safety after Eric Reid was inactive for three games (Weeks 3–5) due to a knee injury. In Week 8, he tied his season-high of seven combined tackles during a 33–10 loss at the Philadelphia Eagles. The following week, Tartt recorded three combined tackles before exiting in the third quarter of the 49ers' 20–10 loss to the Arizona Cardinals after breaking his arm. On November 6, 2017, the 49ers placed Tartt on injured reserve due to his fractured forearm. He finished the 2017 season with 55 combined tackles (38 solo), three pass deflections, an interception, and was credited with half a sack in nine games and nine starts.

==== 2018 ====
On April 27, 2018, Tartt signed a two-year, $13 million contract extension with the 49ers through the 2020 season. He started eight games while dealing with a shoulder injury throughout the year. He was placed on injured reserve on December 21, 2018. He finished the season with 42 total tackles (32 solo), two passes defensed, and one interception.

==== 2019 ====
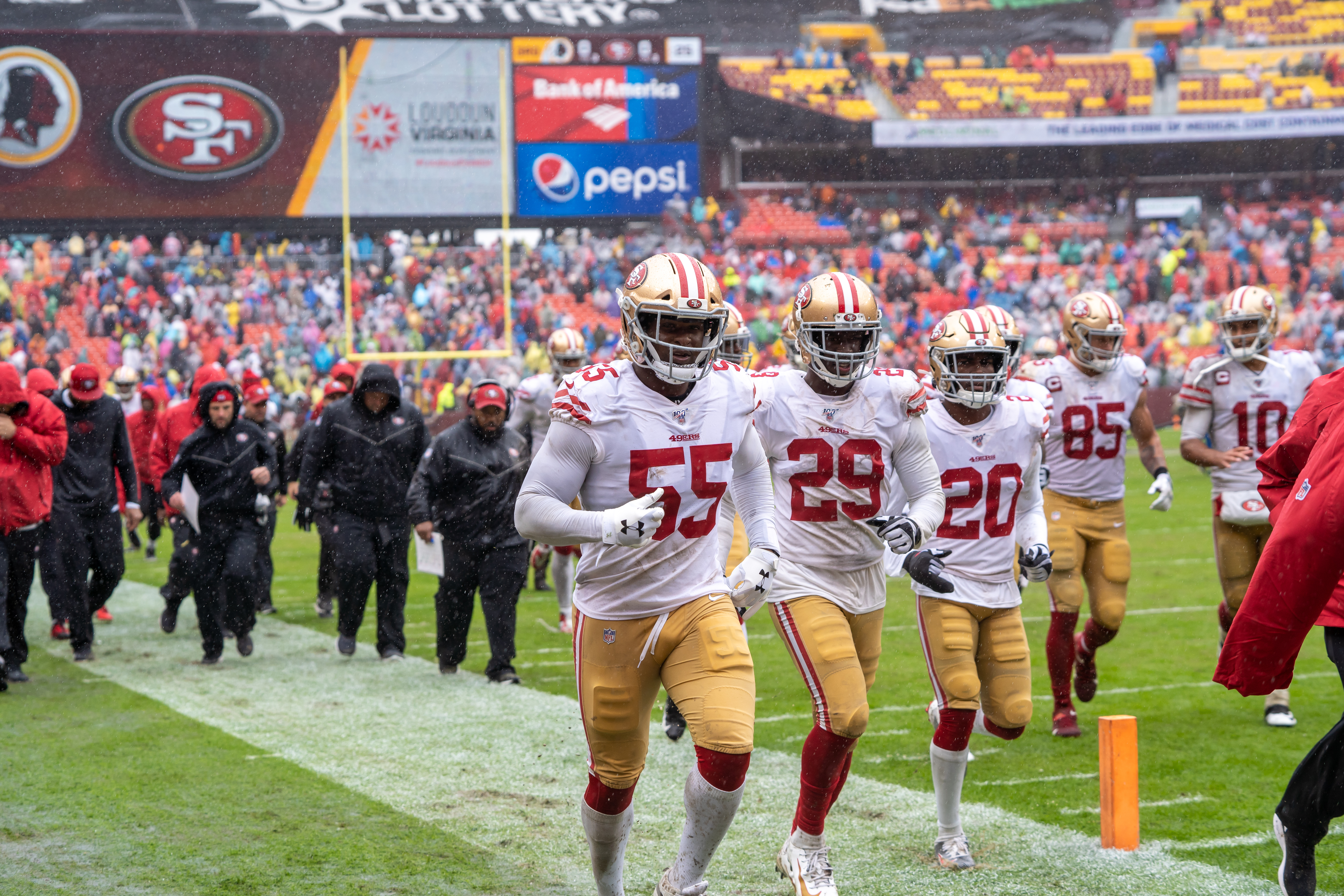
Tartt in a game against the Washington Redskins

In Week 10 against the Seahawks on Monday Night Football, Tartt forced a fumble on rookie wide receiver DK Metcalf which he recovered in the 27–24 overtime loss. In the 2019 season, he appeared in and started 12 games. He finished with 48 total tackles (34 solo), one interception, two passes defended, and one forced fumble. In Super Bowl LIV against the Kansas City Chiefs, Tartt recorded a sack on Patrick Mahomes during the 31–20 loss.

==== 2020 ====
In Week 1 against the Cardinals, Tartt recorded his first interception of the season off a pass thrown by Kyler Murray during the 24–20 loss. He suffered turf toe in Week 9 and was placed on injured reserve on November 11, 2020.

==== 2021 ====
Tartt re-signed with the 49ers on a one-year contract on March 22, 2021. He was placed on injured reserve on October 30, 2021. He was activated on November 20. In the 2021 season, Tartt appeared in and started 14 games. He finished with 66 total tackles (42 solo) and one pass defended.

Against the Los Angeles Rams in the NFC Championship, Tartt had six tackles, but dropped a critical would-be interception in the fourth quarter in the 20-17 loss.

=== Philadelphia Eagles ===
Tartt agreed to terms with the Eagles on a one-year contract on June 17, 2022. He was released on August 30.

== NFL career statistics ==
Year	Team	Games		Tackles					Interceptions						Fumbles	
Year	Team	GP	GS	Comb	Solo	Ast	Sack	Sfty	PD	Int	Yds	Avg	Lng	TD	FF	FR
2015	SF	15	8	65	52	13	2.0	0	3	1	25	25.0	25	0	1	0
2016	SF	15	6	51	47	14	1.0	0	3	—	—	—	—	—	—	—
2017	SF	9	9	55	38	17	0.5	0	3	1	37	37.0	37	0	—	—
2018	SF	8	8	42	32	10	0.0	0	2	1	23	23.0	23	0	—	—
2019	SF	12	12	48	34	14	0.5	0	2	—	—	—	—	—	1	2
2020	SF	7	7	30	20	10	0.0	0	4	1	16	16.0	16	0	—	—
2021	SF	14	14	66	42	24	0.0	0	1	—	—	—	—	—	—	—
Career		80	64	367	265	102	4.0	0	18	4	101	25.3	37	0	2	2
