= Eric Reid =

American football player (born 1991)

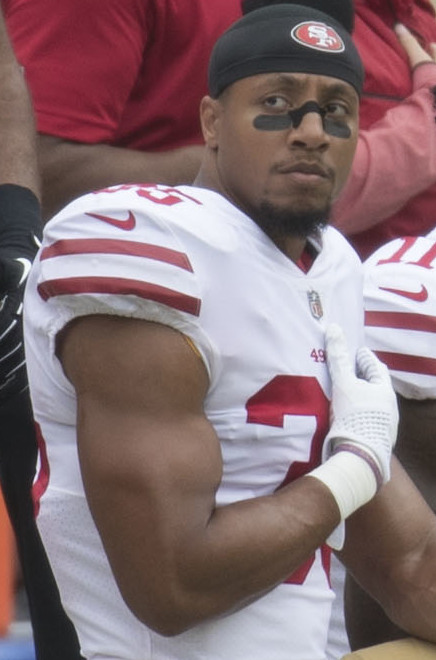
- Reid with the San Francisco 49ers in 2017

No. 35, 25
- Position: Safety

Personal information
- Born: December 10, 1991 (age 34); Baton Rouge, Louisiana, U.S.
- Listed height: 6 ft 1 in (1.85 m)
- Listed weight: 215 lb (98 kg)

Career information
- High school: Dutchtown (Geismar, Louisiana)
- College: LSU (2010–2012)
- NFL draft: 2013: 1st round, 18th overall pick

Career history
- San Francisco 49ers (2013–2017); Carolina Panthers (2018–2019)

Awards and highlights
- Pro Bowl (2013); PFWA All-Rookie Team (2013); Consensus All-American (2012); First-team All-SEC (2012); Second-team All-SEC (2011)

Career NFL statistics
- Total tackles: 519
- Sacks: 6.0
- Forced fumbles: 3
- Fumble recoveries: 5
- Interceptions: 11
- Stats at Pro Football Reference

Eric Todd Reid Jr. (born December 10, 1991) is an American former professional football player who was a safety in the National Football League (NFL). He played college football for LSU Tigers, receiving consensus All-American recognition. He was selected in the first round of the 2013 NFL draft by the San Francisco 49ers, with whom he made the 2014 Pro Bowl.

== Early life ==
Reid was born to Eric Reid Sr. and Sharon Reid in Baton Rouge, Louisiana. He attended Dutchtown High School in Geismar, Louisiana, where he played football, basketball, and ran track. In football, he recorded 78 tackles, nine sacks, four interceptions, and three fumble recoveries as a junior. As a senior, he received Louisiana Class 5A All-state honors after registering 45 tackles and three interceptions. He played in the 2010 U.S. Army All-American Bowl.

Also a standout track & field athlete, Reid followed in his father's footsteps to excel in the hurdling events while at Dutchtown. His father was the 1987 NCAA Champion while at LSU. In sprints, he set a personal record time of 6.69 seconds in the 55-meter dash at the 2009 LSU High School Indoor Classic. In the hurdling events, he placed 4th in the 55-meter hurdles at the 2009 High School Last Chance Qualifier, with a personal record time of 8.00 seconds. His career-best time of 14.2 seconds in the 110-meter hurdles at the 2010 Dutchtown 4-way Meet, where he won gold.

== College career ==
Reid enrolled at Louisiana State University, where he played for coach Les Miles's LSU Tigers football team from 2010 to 2012. As a freshman in 2010, Reid played in 13 games with three starts. He finished the season with 32 tackles and two interceptions. As a first-year starter as a sophomore in 2011, Reid recorded 76 tackles, two interceptions, and two forced fumbles. He was named a second-team All-American by Rivals.com and was a second-team All-SEC selection by the Associated Press.

As a junior in 2012, he started all 13 games at safety and finished third on the team in tackles with 91 (42 unassisted), two interceptions, and seven pass breakups. He was recognized as a consensus first-team All-American, having received first-team honors from the American Football Coaches Association, Football Writers Association of America, ESPN, and Scout.com, and second-team honors from the Associated Press, Walter Camp Football Foundation, Athlon Sports, CBSsports.com, and Sports Illustrated. He was also a first-team All-SEC selection.

== Professional career ==
=== Pre-draft ===
Coming out of LSU, Reid was projected to be a first- or second-round pick by a majority of NFL draft experts and scouts. He received an invitation to the NFL combine and completed all of the required combine and positional drills. On March 27, 2013, he opted to participate at LSU's pro day, and chose to perform positional drills, the 40-yard dash (4.50), 20-yard dash (2.60), and 10-yard dash (1.54) for the scouts and team representatives in attendance. He was ranked the second best free safety in the draft by NFLDraftScout.com, the third best safety prospect by NFL analyst Mike Mayock, and the fourth best safety in the draft by Sports Illustrated.

Pre-draft measurables
Height	Weight	Arm length	Hand span	Wingspan	40-yard dash	10-yard split	20-yard split	20-yard shuttle	Three-cone drill	Vertical jump	Broad jump	Bench press
6 ft 1 1/4 in (1.86 m)	213 lb (97 kg)	33 5/8 in (0.85 m)	10 in (0.25 m)	6 ft 8 5/8 in (2.05 m)	4.50 s	1.54 s	2.60 s	4.22 s	6.99 s	40.5 in (1.03 m)	11 ft 2 in (3.40 m)	17 reps
All values from NFL Combine/Pro Day

=== San Francisco 49ers ===
==== 2013 ====
The San Francisco 49ers selected Reid in the first round (18th overall) of the 2013 NFL draft. In order to select Reid, the 49ers traded their first- (31st overall) and third-round picks (74th overall) in the 2013 NFL Draft to the Dallas Cowboys. He was the second safety selected behind Kenny Vaccaro (15th overall, Saints) and the second of six LSU players selected in the first three rounds, breaking the NFL draft record. A total of nine players from LSU were drafted in 2013, setting a new school record.

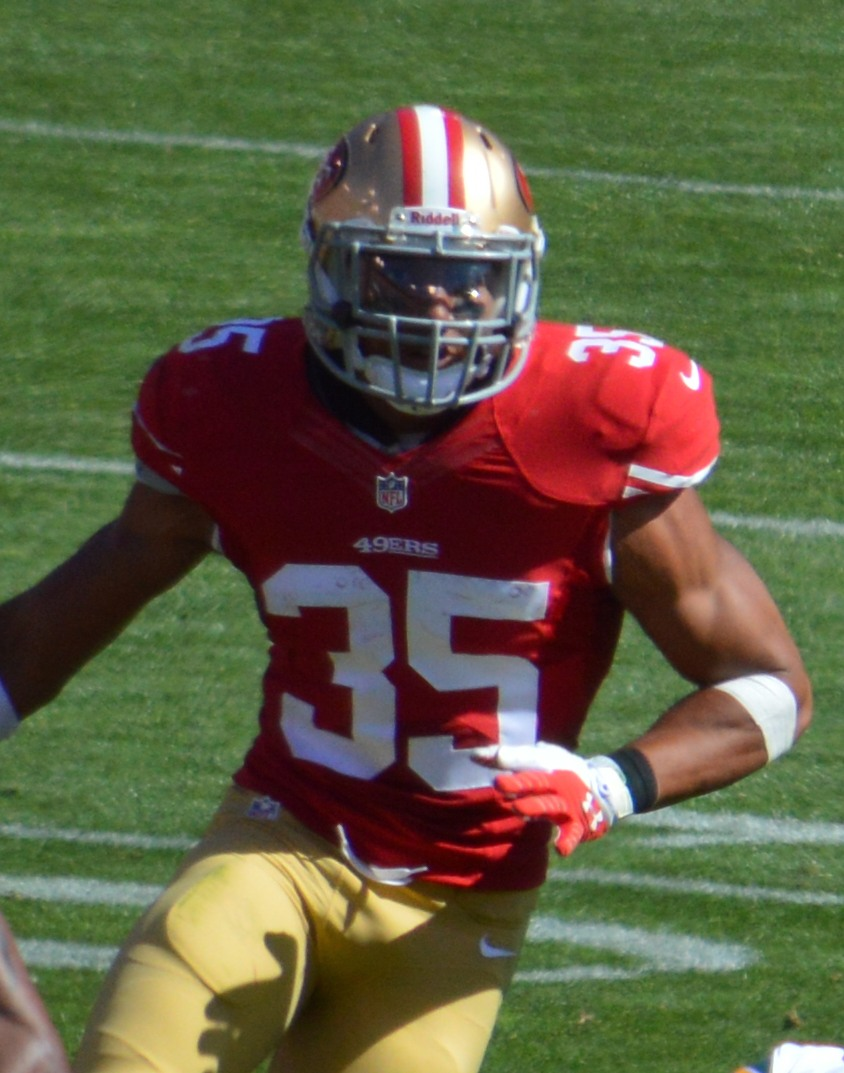
Reid in 2013

On July 5, 2013, the San Francisco 49ers signed Reid to a fully guaranteed four-year, $8.48 million contract that included a signing bonus of $4.54 million.

Reid was drafted to become the starting free safety after the San Francisco 49ers had lost Dashon Goldson, who opted to sign with the Tampa Bay Buccaneers during free agency. Reid competed with veterans Craig Dahl and C. J. Spillman throughout training camp, in an effort to win the job as the starting free safety. Head coach Jim Harbaugh named him the starting free safety to start the 2013 season.

In his professional regular season debut and first career start in the San Francisco 49ers' season-opener against the Green Bay Packers, he recorded seven solo tackles and a pass deflection, and intercepted a pass attempt by Aaron Rodgers during the 34–28 victory. The following week he earned two solo tackles, defended a pass, and made his second career interception, picking off a pass attempt by Seattle Seahawks' quarterback Russell Wilson in the 49ers' 29–3 loss. Unfortunately, he was unable to finish the game after suffering a concussion.

In Week 6, Reid collected three combined tackles, deflected a pass, recovered a fumble, and intercepted a pass attempt by Carson Palmer and returned it 53 yards, as the San Francisco 49ers defeated the Arizona Cardinals 32–20. On December 29, 2013, he earned a season-high ten combined tackles and defended a pass during the 49ers' 23–20 victory over the Arizona Cardinals. He finished his rookie season with 77 combined tackles (62 solo), 11 pass deflections, and four interceptions in 16 games and 16 starts. He was named to the PFWA All-Rookie Team. Reid was voted to be an alternate for the 2014 Pro Bowl.

The 49ers finished second in the NFC West with a 12–4 record under Jim Harbaugh in 2013. On January 5, 2014, Reid started in his first career playoff game and recorded nine combined tackles en route to a 23–20 victory over the Green Bay Packers in the NFC Wildcard game. On January 19, 2014, the 49ers played the Seattle Seahawks in the NFC Championship and Reid made four combined tackles in the 23–17 loss. On January 21, 2014, it was reported that Reid would be replacing Kam Chancellor in the 2014 Pro Bowl.

==== 2014 ====
Reid competed with rookie Jimmie Ward for the starting free safety position throughout training camp. Reid was named the starting free safety to begin the 2014 season.

Reid started the San Francisco 49ers' season-opener against the Dallas Cowboys and recorded four combined tackles, deflected a pass and intercepted a pass attempt by Tony Romo in the 28–17 victory. On November 9, 2014, he collected a season-high six combined tackles and defended a pass in the 49ers' 27–24 win over the New Orleans Saints. The next week, Reid made three solo tackles, two pass deflections and intercepted a pass attempt by New York Giants' quarterback Eli Manning during a 16–10 victory by the 49ers. On December 14, 2015, he recorded three combined tackles, defended a pass and had a 73-yard return after intercepting Russell Wilson in a 17–7 loss at the Seattle Seahawks. The following game, Reid suffered a concussion in a 38–35 overtime loss to the San Diego Chargers. He decided to sit out the following week as a precaution and stated that an additional factor in his decision was that the 49ers had missed the playoffs after finishing with an 8–8 record. Reid finished the 2014 season with an impressive total of 42 combined tackles (34 solo), seven pass deflections and three interceptions in 15 starts. Head coach Jim Harbaugh was fired by the San Francisco 49ers immediately following the end of the regular season.

On June 9, 2015, it was reported by the San Francisco Chronicle that Reid had contemplated retirement due to concerns over concussions after having suffered three in just the first two seasons of his professional career. The report of Reid's prospective early retirement was distressing news to the 49ers fanbase already concerned with the recent exodus of multiple players, including the surprise retirements of Chris Borland and Anthony Davis. Reid immediately denied that he had ever seriously considered retirement, stating that his comments were taken "out of context" by reporter Eric Branch. He posted on Twitter, "The media always finds a way to twist your words...they just want you to click on their article." and further added, "Just to be clear, I NEVER SAID, I've given some thought to leaving the NFL!"

==== 2015 ====
Reid remained the starting free safety to begin the 2015 season under new head coach Jim Tomsula.

On November 22, 2015, he recorded a season-high ten combined tackles in a 29–13 loss to the Seattle Seahawks. During a Week 14 contest against the Cleveland Browns, Reid tied his season-high with ten combined tackles (9 solo) in a 24–10 loss. The following week, he made four solo tackles and had his first career sack on Cincinnati Bengals' quarterback Andy Dalton, as the 49ers suffered a 24–14 loss. He finished the season with 72 combined tackles (60 solo), seven pass deflections, and a sack in 16 games and 16 starts. The San Francisco 49ers fired Jim Tomsula after the 49ers finished with a 5–11 record.

==== 2016 ====
On May 2, 2016, the San Francisco 49ers picked up Reid's fifth-year option on his rookie contract. Under the agreement, he earned $5.67 million for the 2017 season.

With Jimmie Ward moving to cornerback, Reid became the de facto free safety entering the regular season. On September 25, 2016, Reid recorded a career-high 12 combined tackles in an 37–18 loss to the Seattle Seahawks. On November 13, 2016, he made five combined tackles, two deflected passes, and intercepted a pass from Carson Palmer in a 23–20 loss to the Arizona Cardinals. During a Week 11 matchup against the New England Patriots, Reid collected seven solo tackles as the 49ers lost 30–17. He was unable to finish the game after suffering a torn bicep. He had an MRI and surgery to repair the tear the following day.

On November 22, 2016, he was placed on injured /reserve. He finished with 62 combined tackles (48 solo), five pass deflections, and an interception in ten games and ten starts. Head coach Chip Kelly was fired after posting a dismal 2–14 record in his only season with the San Francisco 49ers.

==== 2017 ====
On February 6, 2017, former Atlanta Falcons' offensive coordinator Kyle Shanahan was hired as the new head coach of the San Francisco 49ers. This made him Reid's fourth different head coach in five years. Defensive coordinator Robert Saleh switched cornerback Jimmie Ward back to his natural position at free safety and moved Reid to strong safety in training camp.

On September 17, 2017, Reid had seven combined tackles during the 49ers' 12–9 loss to the Seattle Seahawks. He suffered a knee injury that kept him from playing in Weeks 3–5. During that span, Jaquiski Tartt flourished in Reid's strong safety role. With Tartt now the starting strong safety, Reid was moved to a hybrid safety/linebacker role after linebacker Navorro Bowman was granted a release and Malcolm Smith suffered a season-ending pectoral injury. Defensive coordinator Robert Saleh said the move was in response to having three starting-caliber safeties and getting the best 11 players on the field together. On October 22, 2017, he debuted in his new role and recorded four solo tackles in a 40–10 loss to the Dallas Cowboys. The following week, free safety Jimmie Ward suffered a fractured forearm during a 33–10 loss to the Philadelphia Eagles. This prompted the San Francisco 49ers' coaching staff to move Jaquiski Tartt to Ward's free safety role and move Reid back to his strong safety position. On November 5, 2017, Reid recorded four combined tackles, deflected a pass, and intercepted a pass attempt by Arizona Cardinals' quarterback Drew Stanton, as the 49ers lost 20–10.

=== Carolina Panthers ===
==== 2018 ====
On September 27, 2018, after placing starting safety Da'Norris Searcy on injured reserve, the Carolina Panthers signed Reid to a one-year deal. Despite a lot of speculation about new Panthers owner David Tepper's thoughts and agenda in contrast to those of the prior owner Jerry Richardson, Tepper and general manager Marty Hurney insisted that the signing was purely a football decision. Reid refused to disclose more details about the circumstances leading to his signing in a press conference later that day, citing the fact that the information pertained to his collusion lawsuit. Head coach Ron Rivera announced on October 5, 2018, that Reid would start at the free safety position in his season debut against the Giants on October 7, 2018. Reid ended up taking a knee before the game, becoming the first Panthers player ever to do so, and totaled three tackles. He finished the season starting in 13 games, recording 71 tackles, one sack, five passes defensed, and an interception.

==== 2019 ====
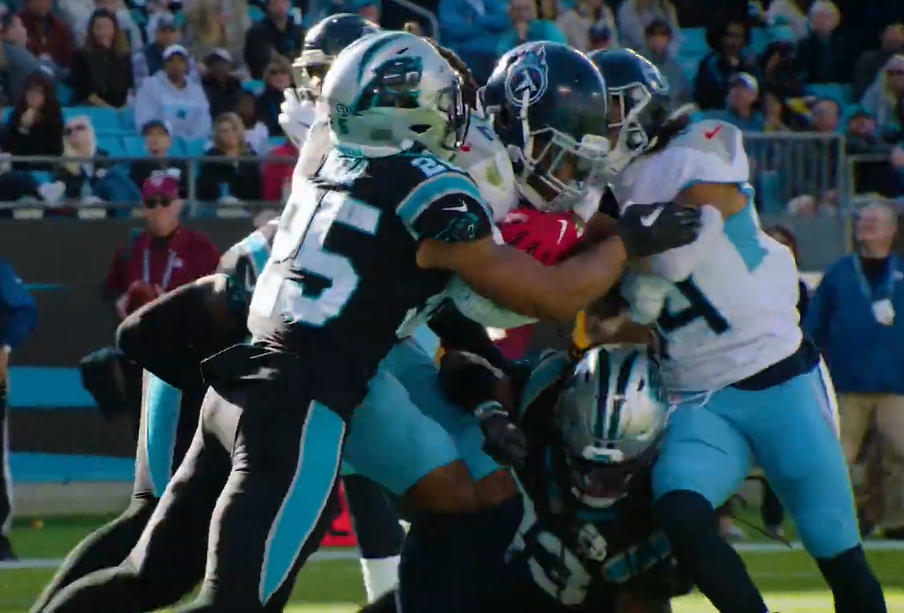
Reid in a game against the Tennessee Titans

On February 11, 2019, Reid signed a three-year, $22 million contract extension with the Panthers. In week 5 against the Jacksonville Jaguars, Reid forced a fumble on Gardner Minshew and recovered the ball in the 34–27 win. In Week 9 against the Tennessee Titans, Reid recorded a team-high 11 tackles, sacked Ryan Tannehill once, and forced a fumble on running back Dion Lewis that was recovered by teammate Donte Jackson in the 30–20 win. In week 12 against the New Orleans Saints, Reid recorded a team-high 15 tackles in the 34–31 loss.

On March 18, 2020, Reid was released by the Panthers.

Mid-way through the 2020 season, Reid was offered an opportunity to reunite with coach Ron Rivera on the Washington Football Team practice squad. Reid declined the offer, stating "I just don't think playing on the practice squad is reflective or indicative of my career."

== NFL career statistics ==
Year	Team	GP	Comb	Solo	Ast	Sack	FF	FR	Yds	Int	Yds	Avg	Lng	TD	PD
2013	SF	16	77	62	15	0.0	0	2	0	4	54	13.5	53	0	11
2014	SF	15	41	35	7	0.0	0	0	0	3	138	46.0	73	0	7
2015	SF	16	71	60	11	1.0	1	0	0	0	0	0	0	0	7
2016	SF	10	62	48	14	0.0	1	0	0	1	13	13.0	13	0	5
2017	SF	13	67	53	14	0.0	0	1	0	2	0	0.0	0	0	4
2018	CAR	13	71	50	21	1.0	0	0	0	1	39	39.0	39	0	5
2019	CAR	16	130	97	33	4.0	1	2	0	0	0	0.0	0	0	6
Career		99	520	405	115	6.0	3	5	0	11	244	22.2	73	0	45

== Protest activities and collusion grievance against the NFL ==
In May 2018, Reid filed an official grievance letter with the NFL alleging that team owners and the league, influenced by President Donald Trump, colluded to prevent his employment due to his protest activities. Reid was the second NFL player after Colin Kaepernick to participate in U.S. national anthem protests intended to highlight social awareness and racial injustice towards black people. Reid's lawyers also represent Kaepernick in a similar grievance case against the NFL. Trump, who publicly condemned the kneeling protests and urged that the protesting players be fired, had private conversations with NFL owners about the player protests during the time period. Team owners have said they are concerned about being in conflict with Trump in regards to the anthem protests. During a job interview with Cincinnati Bengals owner Mike Brown, Reid reportedly refused to say whether he would obey a rule against kneeling during the anthem. In Reid's introductory press conference with the Panthers on September 27, 2018, he wore a shirt that supported Kaepernick and stated that his collusion lawsuit would still proceed unimpeded.

David Tepper, the new owner of the Panthers, was not named in the lawsuit since he was not yet a team owner when it was filed. Tepper also had been quite outspoken with his remarks about President Trump in the recent past and was more open to players expressing themselves and protesting than the rest of the team owners. Nonetheless, the Panthers organization said the Reid signing was football-oriented only.

When asked by reporters during the press conference about plans to protest now that he had signed with a new team, Reid did not answer the questions and cited the fact that the information pertained to his grievance. Reid did not directly say that he would no longer kneel prior to games but stated that he was "considering other ways" of protesting. In his season debut on October 7, 2018, at home in Charlotte against the Giants, he took a knee prior to the game.

By the Panthers' Week 15 loss to the New Orleans Saints, Reid claimed he had been drug-tested seven times during the 2018 season, even though he had played in only 11 games; accounting for a mandatory test, the probability of such an instance happening randomly is approximately 0.17%. Reid saw this as evidence of being targeted by the league and planned on including these seven drug tests as part of his case file in the proceedings of his collusion grievance against the league. A joint investigation by the NFL and National Football League Players Association concluded that Reid's claims about the number of times he was drug-tested were inaccurate.

== Personal life ==
His brother, Justin, is a safety in the NFL.
