= Davidson High School (Mobile, Alabama) =

W. P. Davidson High School
- William Pickett Davidson Senior High School

Location
- 3900 Pleasant Valley Road; Mobile, Alabama 36609; United States; 30.66254°N 88.14631°W

Information
- Type: Public
- Motto: Learners today Leaders tomorrow
- Established: 1960 (66 years ago)
- School district: Mobile County Public Schools (MCPSS)
- CEEB code: 011839
- Principal: Jason Richardson
- Teaching staff: 84.00 (FTE)
- 9-12: 9-12
- Enrollment: 1,473 (2023–2024)
- Student to teacher ratio: 17.54
- Campus: 36 acres in Mobile
- Colors: Black and gold
- Mascot: Warriors
- Nickname: WP or DHS
- Accreditation: National Blue Ribbon School 1990–1991 and in 1994–1996
- Newspaper: Warrior Times
- Yearbook: TOSHOA
- Website: www.wpdavidson.org

W. P. Davidson High School is a four-year senior high school located in Mobile, Alabama. The school operates in the Mobile County Public School System.

The school serves a section of Tillmans Corner.

There are roughly 1,700 students and 110–125 staff members at the school.

== Engineering Pathways Integrated Curriculum (EPIC) ==
Davidson's EPIC program attracts students from throughout Mobile County and offers courses in mechanical, electrical, and chemical engineering. Students can also take engineering-focused math, science, and drafting courses. The program requires its major students to complete five math or science courses in addition to the four math and four science courses required by the State of Alabama. Senior majors are required to complete Advanced Placement Physics and Advanced Placement Calculus AB. EPIC minors pursue a less rigorous course load in preparation for jobs in industry and technology.

== International Baccalaureate ==
In November 2007, Davidson High School became an International Baccalaureate World School. The school is one of two state funded, international baccalaureate high schools in the Mobile County Public School System. Davidson High School is a founding member of IBSA (IB Schools of Alabama). Freshmen and sophomores at Davidson take preparatory classes and begin the IB program as juniors.

== Robotics ==
Davidson participates in BEST Robotics. The team, RobotEx, has experienced success in the program.

== School uniform ==
Davidson High School has a mandatory school uniform policy. Traditionally, Davidson students wear white button down oxford shirts, khaki pants, black belts, and black shoes. Black sweatshirts must be from a Davidson club or an all black sweatshirt. As of the 2024-2025 school year, black polos and black and white shoes also became available for students to wear. Hoodies of any kind were not allowed to be worn during school hours.

== Feeder patterns ==
The following middle schools feed into Davidson High School:

Portions of the attendance zone:

- Denton Middle School, formally Azalea Road Middle School
- Pillans Middle School
- Washington Middle School
- Burns Middle School (as of 2007)
- Calloway-Smith Middle School (before the 2012–2013 School Year)

== Notable alumni ==
- Jason Caffey, former NBA player
- Cooper Huckabee (Class of 1969), Hollywood actor
- Cedric Johnson, NFL defensive end for the Cincinnati Bengals
- Cephus Johnson, NFL wide receiver for the Tampa Bay Buccaneers
- J.J. Johnson, Miami Dolphins
- Brandon Maye, American football linebacker
- Freddie Robinson, former defensive back of the Indianapolis Colts
- Gregory Slay, Former drummer for Remy Zero
- Jaquiski Tartt, former defensive back of the San Francisco 49ers
- Richard Todd, former quarterback of the New York Jets
- Richard Tyson, Hollywood actor
- Jimmie Ward (Class of 2010), defensive back of the Houston Texans
- Dana Williams, Former MLB player (Boston Red Sox)
