= Jimmie Ward =

American football player (born 1991)

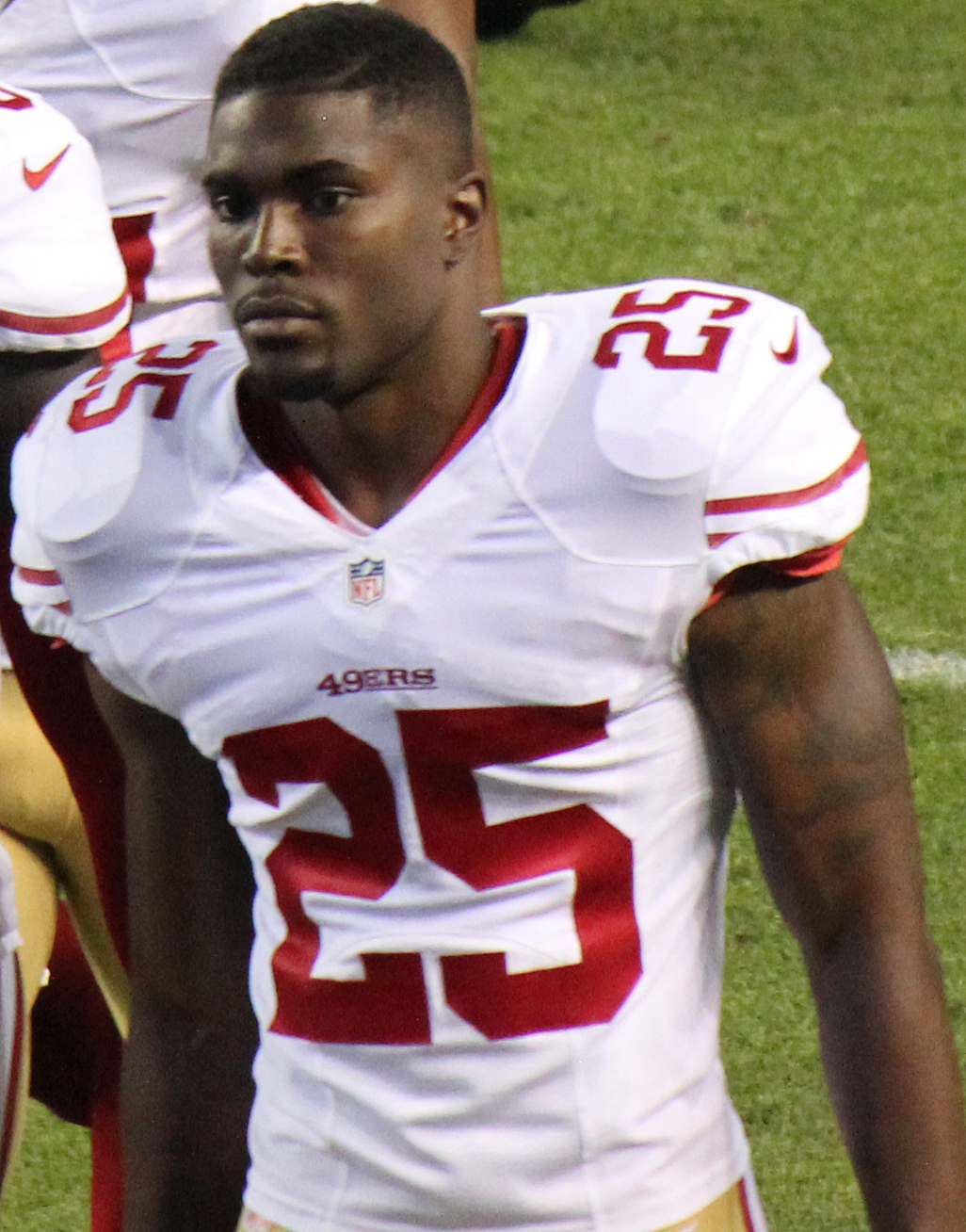
- Ward with the San Francisco 49ers in 2015

Profile
- Position: Safety

Personal information
- Born: July 18, 1991 (age 35); Racine, Wisconsin, U.S.
- Listed height: 5 ft 11 in (1.80 m)
- Listed weight: 193 lb (88 kg)

Career information
- High school: Davidson (Mobile, Alabama)
- College: Northern Illinois (2010–2013)
- NFL draft: 2014: 1st round, 30th overall pick

Career history
- San Francisco 49ers (2014–2022); Houston Texans (2023–2025)

Awards and highlights
- Third-team All-American (2013); 2× First-team All-MAC (2012, 2013); Third-team All-MAC (2011)

Career NFL statistics as of 2025
- Total tackles: 549
- Sacks: 3.0
- Pass deflections: 51
- Interceptions: 10
- Forced fumbles: 6
- Fumble recoveries: 2
- Defensive touchdowns: 3
- Stats at Pro Football Reference

James Ward (born July 18, 1991) is an American professional football safety. He played college football for the Northern Illinois Huskies, and was selected by the San Francisco 49ers in the first round of the 2014 NFL draft.

== Early life ==
Born in Racine, Wisconsin, Ward attended Davidson High School in Mobile, Alabama. He led the Warriors in tackles as a senior with 101 tackles, 73 solo, as Davidson went 10–3 and advanced to the state quarterfinals, while earning team Defensive MVP honors. Ward also recorded eight pass break-ups, an interception, forced two fumbles and recovered three. He added three blocked kicks and three quarterback sacks. As a junior, Ward made 93 tackles, broke up seven passes and intercepted five. He also caused a pair of fumbles and blocked two kicks. He is the cousin of former NBA player Caron Butler.

Ward was considered a two-star recruit by Rivals.com.

== College career ==
Ward attended Northern Illinois University from 2010 to 2013. In 2010, Ward played in all 14 games as a true freshman and blocked a school-record three punts on the year. He also recorded 21 tackles, a forced fumble and a pass break up, and was named the Huskies Special Teams Player of the Year and Freshman of the Year. In 2011, he appeared in all 14 games, and started 12. He was named a third-team All-Mid-American Conference (MAC) selection after recording a career-high 100 tackles, 2.5 tackles for loss, an interception, four pass breakups, a forced fumble and a blocked kick. In 2012, he led the Huskies with 104 tackles, including a career game high 14 against Florida State in the Orange Bowl. He also recorded three interceptions while starting 13 games, earning himself first-team All-MAC honors. In 2013, he led the Huskies in tackles (95), interceptions (7) and pass deflections (12), while earning national recognition as a third-team All-American by the Associated Press. He also earned first-team All-MAC honors for the second consecutive season.

== Professional career ==
=== Pre-draft ===
Coming out of Northern Illinois, Ward was projected to be a first or second round pick by the majority of NFL draft experts and scouts. He received an invitation to the NFL Combine as a top defensive back prospect, but was unable to participate in any physical running or jumping drills after discovering a stress fracture in his foot on the eve of the combine. On March 7, 2014, he opted to participate at Northern Illinois' pro day even though he was still injured and performed all of the combine drills except for the bench press. Scouts and team representatives from 30 NFL teams attended Northern Illinois' pro day as Ward, Jordan Lynch, and five other teammates worked out. Ward attended five private workouts with teams, that included the Indianapolis Colts and Minnesota Vikings. He was ranked the top strong safety prospect in the draft by NFLDraftScout.com and was ranked the third best safety prospect by NFL analyst Mike Mayock and Sports Illustrated.

Pre-draft measurables
Height	Weight	Arm length	Hand span	Wingspan	40-yard dash	10-yard split	20-yard split	20-yard shuttle	Three-cone drill	Vertical jump	Broad jump	Bench press	Wonderlic
5 ft 10 5/8 in (1.79 m)	193 lb (88 kg)	31 in (0.79 m)	9 3/8 in (0.24 m)	6 ft 5 5/8 in (1.97 m)	4.47 s	1.56 s	2.54 s	4.24 s	6.89 s	38.0 in (0.97 m)	10 ft 5 in (3.18 m)	9 reps	17
All values from NFL Combine/Northern Illinois' Pro Day

=== San Francisco 49ers ===
The San Francisco 49ers selected Ward in the first round (30th overall) of the 2014 NFL draft. He was the third safety selected behind Calvin Pryor (18th overall, New York Jets) and HaHa Clinton-Dix (21st overall, Green Bay Packers).

==== 2014 ====
On May 22, 2014, the San Francisco 49ers signed Ward to a four–year, $7.11 million rookie contract that included $5.30 million guaranteed and an initial signing bonus of $3.49 million.

Throughout training camp, he competed with Antoine Bethea and Craig Dahl to be the starting strong safety. Head coach Jim Harbaugh named Ward a backup safety to begin the season, behind starting safeties Antoine Bethea and Eric Reid. He was also tasked with nickel cornerback duties.

Ward made his NFL debut in the season-opener against the Dallas Cowboys and made one tackle during their 28–17 road victory. In the next game, he collected a season-high four solo tackles in a 28–20 loss to the Chicago Bears. The following week against the Arizona Cardinals, Ward recorded two solo tackles and a season-high two pass deflections in a 23–14 loss. He was unable to play during a Week 7 road loss to the Denver Broncos due to a quad injury. On November 9, 2014, he recorded two combined tackles during a 27–24 road victory over the New Orleans Saints. He suffered a foot injury during the game and was placed on injured reserve for the remainder of his rookie season.

Ward finished his rookie year with 20 combined tackles (19 solo) and two pass deflections in eight games.

==== 2015 ====
Ward returned to the 49ers and was again named the backup free safety to Eric Reid under new head coach Jim Tomsula.

Ward made his first NFL start during the season-opener against the Vikings and recorded a tackle in a 20–3 victory. During Week 5, he had eight combined tackles during a 30–27 road loss to the New York Giants. During Week 13, Ward made two combined tackles, deflected a pass, and his first career interception off of a pass attempt by Jay Cutler during a 26–20 road victory over the Bears. He also scored his first NFL touchdown during the game, after he returned his interception for 29-yards. Two weeks later against the Cincinnati Bengals, Ward made six combined tackles, deflected a pass, and made his first NFL sack on Andy Dalton as the 49ers lost 24–14. On January 3, 2016, he collected a season-high ten combined tackles and defended a pass in a 19–16 overtime win over the St. Louis Rams.

Ward finished his second season with career-high 57 combined tackles (48 solo), six pass deflections, a sack, an interception, and a touchdown in 16 games and eight started.

==== 2016 ====
Throughout his first two seasons, Ward was a backup free safety and was tasked with covering the slot. Head coach Chip Kelly was hired to replace Tomsula after the 49ers finished with a 5–11 record the previous season. In training camp, Ward was converted to a full-time cornerback and competed Kenneth Acker, Dontae Johnson, and Chris Davis for the job as the starting cornerback. Ward was named the starting cornerback, opposite Tramaine Brock, to begin the 2016 season.

Ward started the season-opener against the Los Angeles Rams and collected three solo tackles and two pass deflections during a 28–0 shutout victory. Two weeks later against the Seattle Seahawks, he made a tackle and defended a pass during an 37–18 road loss. Unfortunately, Ward suffered a quad injury during a special teams play and was unable to play from Weeks 4–6. During Week 10, Ward made seven solo tackles and a season-high four pass deflections, as the 49ers lost to the Cardinals on the road by a score of 23–20. During Week 14 against the Jets, Ward had a career game as he recorded a season-high 11 combined tackles, deflected three passes, intercepted a pass attempt from quarterback Bryce Petty, and had his first sack of the season in the 23–17 overtime loss. In the next game, Ward recorded two solo tackles during a 41–13 road loss to the Atlanta Falcons. He left the game after suffering a fractured clavicle. On December 20, 2016, he was placed on injured reserve for the rest of the season.

Ward finished his third season with a total of 53 combined tackles (43 solo), a career-high 12 pass deflections, a sack, and an interception in 11 games and 10 starts. Kelly was fired after posting a 2–14 season in 2016.

==== 2017 ====
On May 1, 2017, the 49ers opted to exercise the fifth–year option on Ward's rookie contract, paying him a guaranteed salary of $8.52 million for the 2018 NFL season. At the beginning of training camp, new defensive coordinator Robert Saleh installed a cover 3 base defense and opted to move Ward back to his original position of free safety. This was his third different position in four seasons and his fourth head coach and defensive coordinator in that same span. Head coach Kyle Shanahan named Ward the starting free safety to begin the regular season. Ward suffered a hamstring injury and was unable to play in the season-opener against the Carolina Panthers and was replaced by Jaquiski Tartt.

On September 17, 2017, Ward made his season debut and recorded five combined tackles and deflected a pass in a 12–9 road loss to the Seahawks. The following week, he made his first start as a free safety and collected a season-high seven solo tackles during a narrow 41–39 loss to the Rams. During Week 8, Ward made three combined tackles in a 33–10 road loss to the Philadelphia Eagles. He left the game after suffering a fractured forearm. On November 1, 2017, Ward was placed on injured reserve for the remainder of the season.

Ward finished the 2017 season with a total of 32 combined tackles (27 solo) and a pass deflection in six starts and seven games. Pro Football Focus gave him an overall grade of 46.9, ranking him 77th among all qualified safeties in 2017.

==== 2018 ====
In 2018, Ward played in nine games with seven starts, recording 24 tackles and a forced fumble. During a Week 12 27–9 road loss to the Tampa Bay Buccaneers, Ward suffered a broken forearm. He was placed on injured reserve on November 27, 2018.

==== 2019 ====
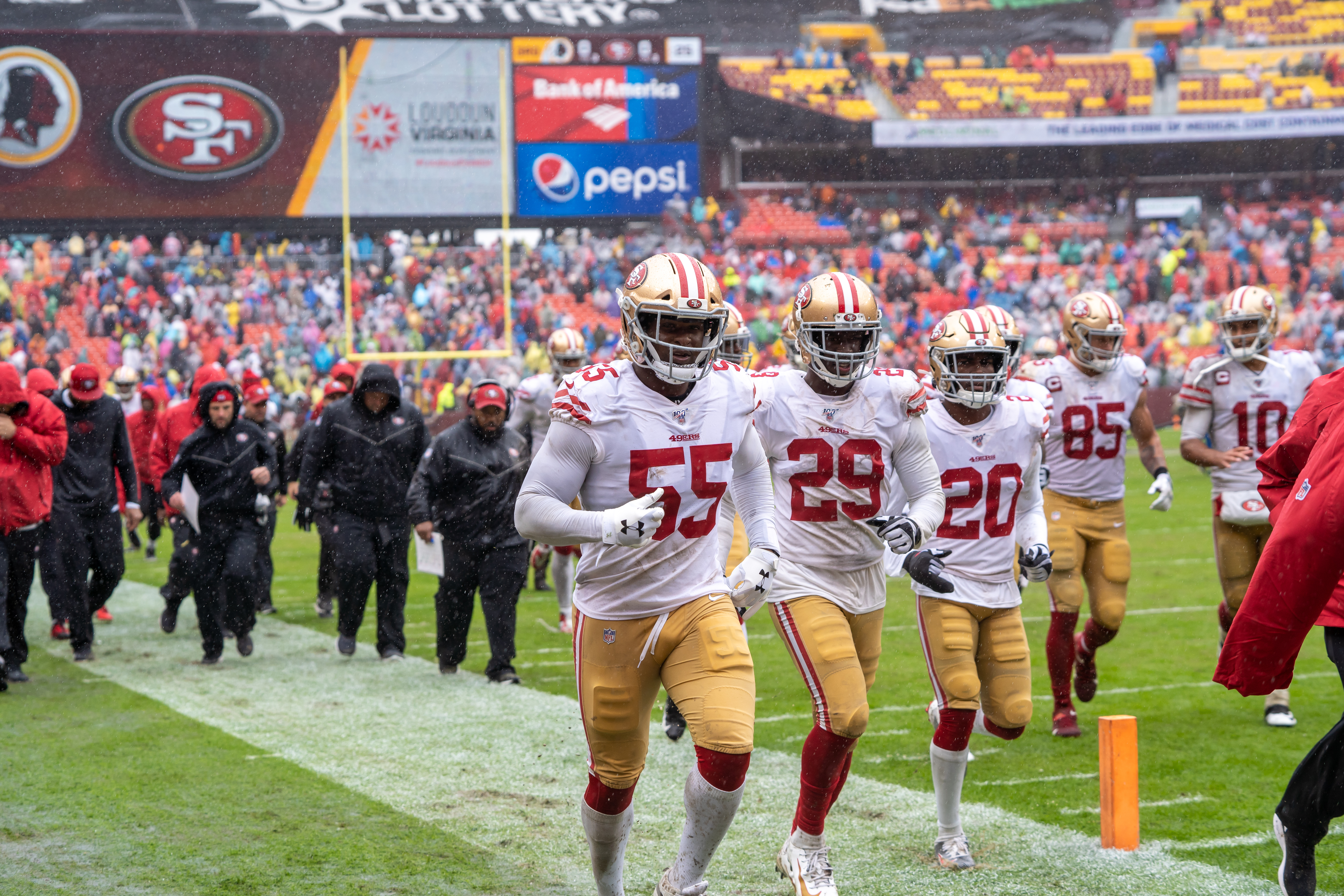
Ward (20) with the 49ers in 2019

On March 13, 2019, the San Francisco 49ers signed Ward to a one–year, $4.50 million contract extension that included $3.00 million guaranteed upon signing and an initial signing bonus of $1.00 million. In Super Bowl LIV against the Kansas City Chiefs, Ward recorded a team high 11 tackles during the 31–20 loss.

==== 2020 ====
On March 24, 2020, the San Francisco 49ers signed Ward to a three–year, $28.50 million contract extension that included $16.50 million guaranteed, $13.00 million guaranteed upon signing, and an initial signing bonus of $8.00 million.

In Week 12 against the Rams, Ward forced fumbles on Jared Goff and Malcolm Brown that were both recovered by the 49ers during the 23–20 win.

==== 2021 ====
In the divisional round against the Packers in 2021, Ward blocked a 39-yard field goal attempted by the Packers kicker, Mason Crosby. This was also the first season since 2016 in which Ward intercepted a pass.

==== 2022 ====
On August 31, 2022, Ward was placed on injured reserve. He was activated on October 8. Ward was moved to nickel cornerback with the emerging play of safety Tashaun Gipson.

=== Houston Texans ===
==== 2023 ====
On March 18, 2023, the Houston Texans signed Ward to a two–year, $13.00 million contract that included $8.50 million guaranteed and a signing bonus of $4.00 million. He was named a team captain ahead of the 2023 season.

Ward missed the first two games of the 2023 season due to a hip injury. He returned to practice ahead of the Week 3 game against the Jacksonville Jaguars that the Texans won 37–17. In Week 4 against the Pittsburgh Steelers he forced a fumble against George Pickens in the 30–6 win. Later in the season, after missing a further 3 games due to a hamstring injury, Ward returned for Week 13 against the Broncos where he recorded an interception with 20 seconds remaining to secure a 22–17 victory. The Texans placed him on injured reserve on December 26, 2023.

==== 2024 ====
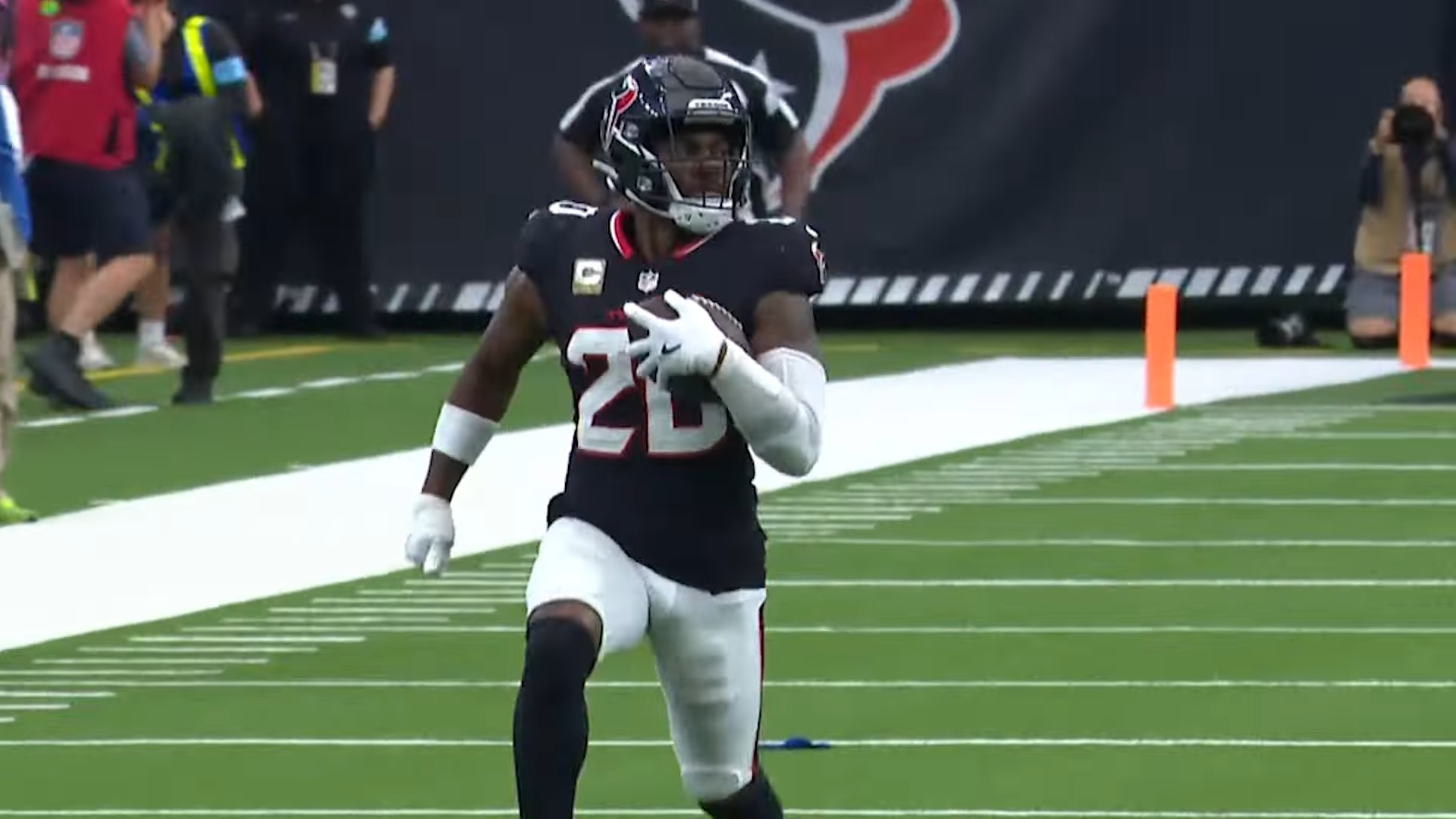
Ward playing for the Houston Texans in 2024.

On August 19, 2024, the Houston Texans signed Ward to a one–year, $10.50 million contract extension that includes $8.75 million guaranteed upon signing and an initial signing bonus of $5.25 million. He started 10 games for Houston in 2024, totaling 2 interceptions, 1 touchdown, 4 pass deflections, and 48 combined tackles. On December 23, it was announced that Ward would miss the remainder of the season due to a foot injury.

On March 3, 2026, Ward was released by the Texans.

== NFL career statistics ==
Legend
**Bold**	Career high

=== Regular season ===
Year	Team	Games		Tackles				Interceptions				Fumbles			
Year	Team	GP	GS	Cmb	Solo	Ast	Sck	PD	Int	Yds	TD	FF	FR	Yds	TD
2014	SF	8	0	20	19	1	—	2	—	—	—	—	—	—	—
2015	SF	**16**	8	57	48	9	**1.0**	6	1	29	**1**	—	—	—	—
2016	SF	11	10	53	43	10	**1.0**	**12**	1	8	—	1	**1**	—	—
2017	SF	7	6	32	27	5	—	1	—	—	—	—	**1**	**43**	—
2018	SF	9	7	24	19	5	—	—	—	—	—	1	—	—	—
2019	SF	13	13	64	**51**	14	**1.0**	8	—	—	—	—	—	—	—
2020	SF	14	14	73	45	**28**	—	4	—	—	—	**2**	—	—	—
2021	SF	**16**	**16**	**77**	**51**	26	—	6	2	27	**1**	—	—	—	—
2022	SF	12	5	50	38	12	—	5	**3**	—	—	1	—	—	—
2023	HOU	10	10	50	33	17	—	3	1	—	—	1	—	—	—
2024	HOU	10	10	48	32	16	—	4	2	**67**	1	−	—	—	—
Career		126	99	549	406	143	3.0	47	10	64	2	6	2	43	—

=== Postseason ===
Year	Team	Games		Tackles				Interceptions				Fumbles			
Year	Team	GP	GS	Cmb	Solo	Ast	Sck	PD	Int	Yds	Avg	FF	FR	Yds	TD
2019	SF	**3**	**3**	**19**	**14**	**5**	—	—	—	—	—	**1**	—	—	—
2021	SF	**3**	**3**	15	10	**5**	—	1	**1**	**23**	—	—	—	—	—
2022	SF	**3**	0	13	12	1	—	**3**	—	—	—	—	—	—	—
Career		9	6	47	36	11	—	4	1	23	—	1	—	—	—

== Legal issues ==
On June 12, 2025, Ward was arrested in Magnolia, Texas on a third degree felony assault charge which was described as "family related." He was then booked into Montgomery County Jail, where he was being held without bond. He would be eventually released on a $30,000 bail. On August 7, 2025, Ward was arrested for drunk driving, which also resulted in him violating one of the conditions for his bail on his June 2025 assault charge. However, it was agreed that Ward would be released the next day after only serving an overnight prison stay.

In September 2025, a Montgomery county court in Texas didn't find probable cause Ward had committed the alleged domestic violence crimes he was accused of and decided not to indict him.
