= DiAndre Campbell =

American football player (born 1991)

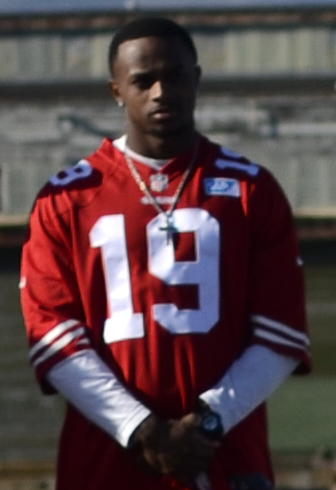
- Campbell with the San Francisco 49ers in 2015

No. 19
- Position: Wide receiver

Personal information
- Born: December 19, 1991 (age 34); Oakland, California, U.S.
- Listed height: 6 ft 2 in (1.88 m)
- Listed weight: 206 lb (93 kg)

Career information
- High school: Oakland Technical
- College: Washington
- NFL draft: 2015: undrafted

Career history
- San Francisco 49ers (2015–2016)*; Winnipeg Blue Bombers (2017)*
- * Offseason or practice squad member only

DiAndre Campbell (born December 19, 1991) is an American former football wide receiver. He played college football for the University of Washington Huskies and was signed by the San Francisco 49ers as an undrafted free agent in 2015.

== Early life ==
DiAndre Campbell was born on December 19, 1991, in Oakland, California, to Stanley and Alfreda Campbell. He attended Oakland Technical High School in Oakland, where he played Oakland Technical Bulldogs high school football. He was a first-team All Oakland Athletic League wide receiver and a second-team All-East Bay defensive back in 2009. He led the Oakland Athletic League in receiving with 28 receptions for 490 yards and 10 touchdowns (regular-season games only). He also notched 70 tackles, three interceptions and five sacks on defense. He was also a standout on the basketball team and participated in track & field.

== College career ==
In 2010, Campbell was redshirted as a freshman. In 2011, he played all 13 games as mostly as special teams performer. In 2012, he won the team's Lifting Award for defense and saw action, mostly on special teams, vs. San Diego State also played as a receiver and on special teams at LSU scored his first career TD on a 20-yard pass from Price early in a win over Portland State two catches for 28 yards vs. the Vikings earned first college start vs. Stanford, catching two passes for 10 yards ... had two catches for 13 yards as a starter at Oregon three receptions for 45 yards vs. No. 11 USC in the Utah game, caught a nine-yard touchdown pass had two catches for 20 in the win at Colorado had four receptions for 42 yards at Washington State started in the MAACO Bowl Las Vegas earned honorable mention Academic All-Pac-12 honors. In 2013, he earned honorable mention Academic All-Pac-12 won the 101 Club Academic Award at the team's postseason awards banquet also won a 2014 Celebration Scholarship from the UW's Office of Minority Affairs & Diversity played in every game and caught a pass for 15 yards in the win at Illinois had a 13-yard reception vs. Idaho State one catch at Arizona State. In his final year of college in 2014, he played in all 14 games, starting 12, at wide receiver, earned the UW's Tyee Sports Council Community Service Award, served as a game captain for the Eastern Washington game, one catch for eight yards at Hawai'i, one for four yards in the EWU win, had a 25-yard reception in the win over Illinois, set career highs vs. Georgia State, with six receptions for 71 yards, caught three passes for 31 yards vs. Stanford, caught an 11-yard touchdown pass in the win at California, when he also served as a game captain, one catch at Oregon, three receptions for 13 yards vs. Arizona State, three catches for 27 yards in the win at Colorado, one reception for 13 yards vs. UCLA, two receptions for 27 yards at Arizona, one catch in the Oregon State game.

== Professional career ==
After going undrafted in the 2015 NFL draft, Campbell signed with the San Francisco 49ers on May 5, 2015. He spent the entire 2015 season on their practice squad.

On January 7, 2016, the 49ers signed Campbell to a futures contract. On August 27, 2016, Campbell was released by the 49ers. He was re-signed to the practice squad on December 20, 2016.

Campbell signed with the Winnipeg Blue Bombers of the Canadian Football League on April 20, 2017. He was released by the Blue Bombers on May 1, 2017.

Campbell participated in The Spring League Showcase game in July 2017.
