= Issac Blakeney =

American football player (born 1992)

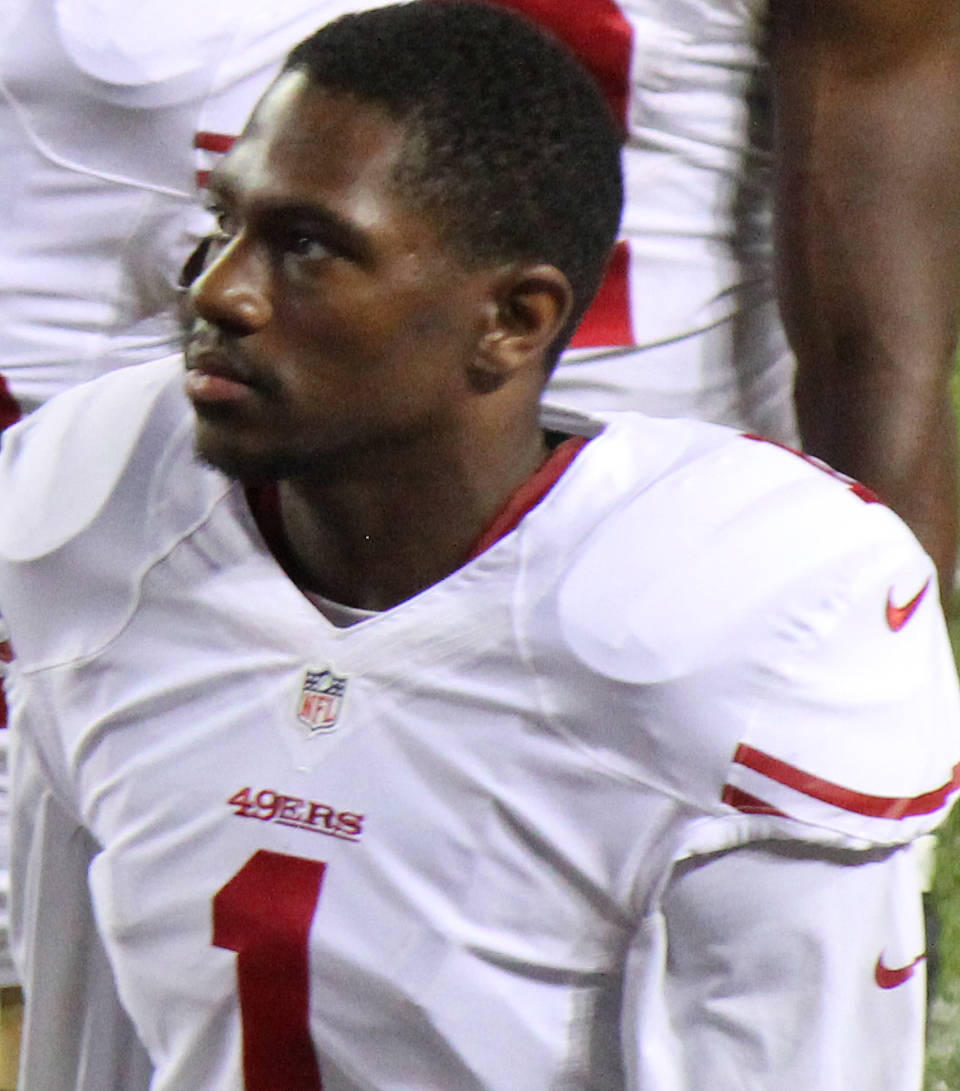
- Blakeney with the San Francisco 49ers in 2015

Profile
- Position: Wide receiver

Personal information
- Born: November 18, 1992 (age 33); Monroe, North Carolina, U.S.
- Listed height: 6 ft 6 in (1.98 m)
- Listed weight: 225 lb (102 kg)

Career information
- High school: Monroe (NC)
- College: Duke
- NFL draft: 2015: undrafted

Career history
- San Francisco 49ers (2015)*; Washington Redskins (2015)*; Pittsburgh Steelers (2016)*
- * Offseason or practice squad member only

Issac Blakeney (born November 18, 1992) is an American former football wide receiver. He played college football at Duke University

== Professional career ==
=== Washington Redskins ===
Blankeney signed to the practice squad of the Washington Redskins on October 5, 2015. He was released on October 16, 2015.

=== Pittsburgh Steelers ===
On February 4, 2016, Blakeney signed a futures contract with the Pittsburgh Steelers. On August 28, he was waived by the Steelers.
