= 2016 San Francisco 49ers season =

American football team season

- Owner: Jed York
- General manager: Trent Baalke
- Head coach: Chip Kelly
- Offensive coordinator: Curtis Modkins
- Defensive coordinator: Jim O'Neil
- Home stadium: Levi's Stadium

Results
- Record: 2–14
- Division place: 4th NFC West
- Playoffs: Did not qualify
- Pro Bowlers: None

Uniform
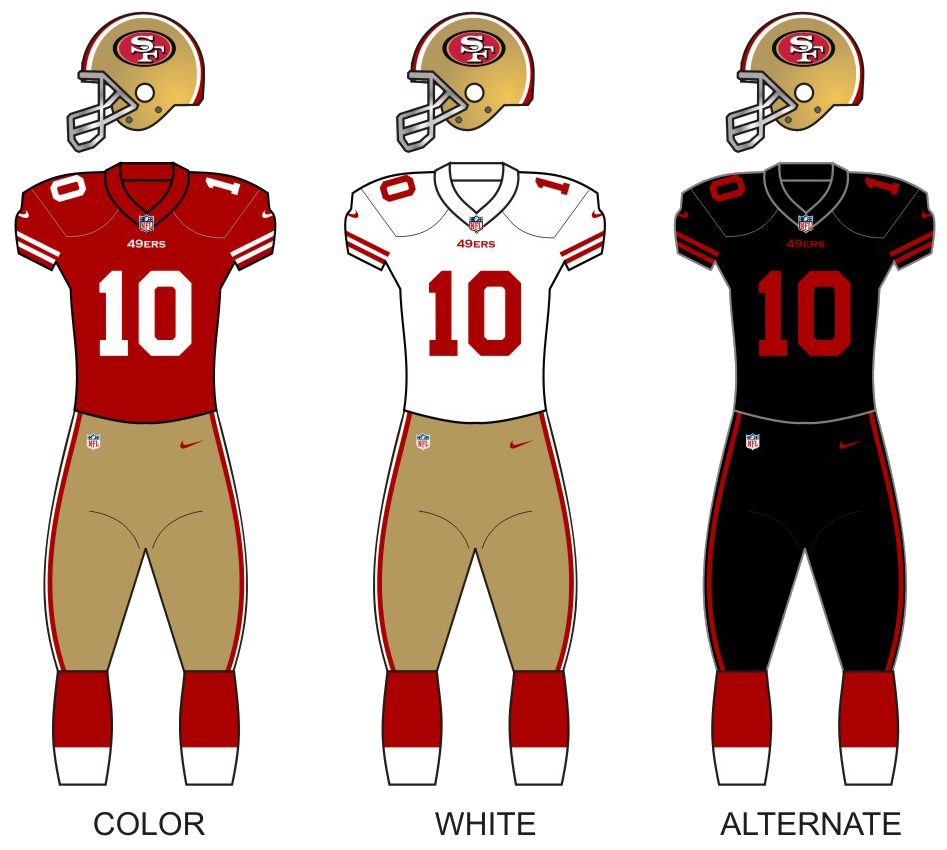

The 2016 season was the San Francisco 49ers' 67th in the National Football League (NFL), their 71st overall, their third playing their home games at Levi's Stadium and their only season under head coach Chip Kelly. The season saw the 49ers attempting to rebound from their 5–11 record the previous year, but they finished 2–14, with both wins coming against their division rival Los Angeles Rams. The 49ers also nearly became the first team (and only the second since the AFL–NFL Merger in 1970) since the 2001 Carolina Panthers to win their opener and lose the remainder of their games, prior to the 49ers' Week 16 win over the Rams. Consequently, the 49ers became the first team to achieve this dubious distinction twice, having previously achieved this 2004, when they also finished 2–14, both wins against the Arizona Cardinals. The 49ers' 1–7 home record tied the worst home record in franchise history (not including the strike-shortened 1982 season). As a result, the 49ers fired Kelly and general manager Trent Baalke.

The 49ers defense also set an NFL record by allowing a 100-yard rusher in seven straight games and easily finished last in the league in rush defense.

== Offseason ==
=== Coaching changes ===
After the 2015 season ended, the 49ers fired Jim Tomsula as head coach. On January 14, 2016, the 49ers hired Chip Kelly as their head coach. Kelly had spent the previous three seasons as head coach for the Philadelphia Eagles and had been fired before finishing what would turn out to be a disappointing 7–9 Eagles season.

=== Roster changes ===
==== Free agency ====
The 49ers entered free agency with the following:

Position	Player	Free agency tag	Date signed	2016 Team	Notes
G	Alex Boone	UFA	March 10, 2016	Minnesota Vikings	Signed 4-year contract
WR	Anquan Boldin	UFA	July 26, 2016	Detroit Lions	-
TE	Garrett Celek	UFA	February 23, 2016	San Francisco 49ers	Signed 4-year extension
DT	Ian Williams	UFA	March 23, 2016	San Francisco 49ers	Signed 1-year contract
G	Jordan Devey	ERFA	April 4, 2016	San Francisco 49ers	Tendered one-year contract
HB	Kendall Gaskins	ERFA	June 20, 2016	San Francisco 49ers	Signed two-year contract
ILB	Michael Wilhoite	RFA	March 8, 2016	San Francisco 49ers	Tendered one-year contract
K	Phil Dawson	UFA	March 14, 2016	San Francisco 49ers	Signed 1-year contract
OLB	Ray-Ray Armstrong	RFA	March 8, 2016	San Francisco 49ers	Signed 1-year extension
RB	Reggie Bush	UFA	August 1, 2016	Buffalo Bills	Signed 1-year contract
RB	Shaun Draughn	UFA	March 2, 2016	San Francisco 49ers	Signed 1-year contract
DE	Tony Jerod-Eddie	RFA	April 4, 2016	San Francisco 49ers	Signed 1-year contract
RFA: Restricted free agent, UFA: Unrestricted free agent, ERFA: Exclusive rights free agent LEGEND – Light green background indicates a player has been re-signed by the 49ers. – Light red background indicates a player has departed the 49ers.

==== Signings ====
Position	Player	2015 Team	Date signed	Notes
WR	Eric Rogers	Calgary Stampeders (CFL)	January 20, 2016	Signed 2-year
QB	Thad Lewis	Philadelphia Eagles	March 10, 2016	Signed 1-year
G	Zane Beadles	Jacksonville Jaguars	March 22, 2016	Signed 3-year
WR	Ryan Whalen	Minnesota Vikings	August 23, 2016	Signed 1-year

Indicates that the player was a free agent at the end of his respective team's 2015 season.

==== Departures ====
Position	Player	Date	Notes
RB	Jarryd Hayne	May 15, 2016	Retired

== Draft ==
2016 San Francisco 49ers draft
Round	Selection	Player	Position	College	Notes
1	7	DeForest Buckner	Defensive end	Oregon	
1	28	Joshua Garnett	Guard	Stanford	From Chiefs^{[a]}
2	37	Traded to the Kansas City Chiefs^{[a]}			
3	68	Will Redmond	Cornerback	Mississippi State	
4	105	Traded to the Kansas City Chiefs^{[a]}			
4	133	Rashard Robinson	Cornerback	LSU	Compensatory pick
5	142	Ronald Blair	Defensive end	Appalachian State	From Chargers^{[b]}
5	145	John Theus	Tackle	Georgia	
5	174	Fahn Cooper	Tackle	Ole Miss	Compensatory pick
6	178	Traded to the Kansas City Chiefs^{[a]}			From Cowboys^{[c]}
6	207	Jeff Driskel	Quarterback	Louisiana Tech	From Broncos^{[d]}
6	211	Kelvin Taylor	Running back	Florida	Compensatory pick
6	213	Aaron Burbridge	Wide receiver	Michigan State	Compensatory pick
7	249	Prince Charles Iworah	Cornerback	Western Kentucky	From Chiefs^{[a]}

Notes

^{^[a]} The 49ers traded their second-, fourth- and sixth-round selection (Nos. 37, 105 and 178 overall) to the Kansas City Chiefs in exchange for their first- and seventh-round selection (Nos. 28 and 249 overall).
^{^[b]} The 49ers acquired an additional fifth-round selection as part of a trade that sent their 2015 first-round selection to the San Diego Chargers.
^{^[c]} The 49ers acquired a sixth-round selection in a trade that sent their 2015 seventh-round selection to the Dallas Cowboys.
^{^[d]} The 49ers traded tight end Vernon Davis and their 2016 seventh-round selection to the Denver Broncos in exchange for the Broncos' 2016 sixth-round and 2017 sixth-round selections.

=== Undrafted free agents ===
Position	Player	College	Notes
DT	Darren Lake	Alabama	released August 27
DT	Demetrius Cherry	Arizona State	released September 3
S	Jered Bell	Colorado	waived August 23
WR	Bryce Treggs	California	released September 3
WR	Devon Cajuste	Stanford	released September 3
LB	Kevin Anderson	Stanford	waived May 12
LB	Wynton McManis	Memphis	released August 27
DE	Lenny Jones	Nevada	
DE	Jay Fanaika	Utah	
K	John Lunsford	Liberty	released August 27
OL	Blake Muir	Baylor	released August 27
OL	Alex Balducci	Oregon	released September 3
OL	Norman Price	Southern Miss	released September 3

== Staff ==
2016 San Francisco 49ers staff
Front office: Co–Chairman – Denise DeBartolo York; Co–Chairman – John York; Chief Executive Officer – Jed York; Co–Owner – Gideon Yu; President – Al Guido; Chief strategy officer/Executive Vice President of Football Operations – Paraag Marathe; Chief Operating Officer – Ethan Casson; General manager – Trent Baalke; Assistant general manager – Tom Gamble; Director of pro personnel – Mike Williams; Assistant director of pro personnel – Quentus Cumby; Director of college scouting – Matt Malaspina; Director of football administration & analytics – Brian Hampton; Head coaches: Head coach – Chip Kelly; Offensive coaches: Offensive coordinator – Curtis Modkins; Quarterbacks – Ryan Day; Running backs – Tom Rathman; Wide receivers – Bob Bicknell; Tight ends – Jeff Nixon; Offensive line – Pat Flaherty; Assistant offensive line – Eric Wolford; Offensive quality control – Mick Lombardi	Defensive coaches: Defensive coordinator – Jim O'Neil; Defensive line – Jerry Azzinaro; Assistant defensive line – Vince Oghobaase; Senior defensive assistant/linebackers – Jason Tarver; Inside linebackers – Joe Bowden; Defensive backs – Jeff Hafley; Assistant defensive backs (Safeties) – Roy Anderson; Defensive quality control – Tem Lukabu; Special teams coaches: Special teams coordinator – Derius Swinton; Assistant special teams – Michael Clay; Support staff: Special assistant to the head coach – Bill Nayes; Special projects – Kevin O'Connell; Coaching assistant – Crowley Hanlon; Senior analyst – Dana Bible; Offensive analyst – Keanon Lowe; Defensive analyst – Brian Duker; Bill Walsh coaching fellowship – Andre Carter

== Final roster ==
2016 San Francisco 49ers roster
Quarterbacks (QB): 2 Blaine Gabbert; 7 Colin Kaepernick; 15 Christian Ponder; Running backs (RB): 22 Mike Davis; 24 Shaun Draughn; 32 DuJuan Harris; 31 Raheem Mostert; Wide receivers (WR): 13 Aaron Burbridge; 14 Chris Harper; 17 Jeremy Kerley; 18 DeAndre Smelter; 81 Rod Streater; Tight ends (TE): 88 Garrett Celek; 49 Jim Dray; 85 Je'Ron Hamm	Offensive linemen (OL): 75 Alex Balducci C; 68 Zane Beadles G; 77 Trent Brown T; 62 Andrew Gardner G; 65 Joshua Garnett G; 74 Joe Staley T; 71 John Theus T; 61 Andrew Tiller G/C; Defensive linemen (DL): 98 Ronald Blair DE; 99 DeForest Buckner DE; 92 Quinton Dial DE; 90 Glenn Dorsey NT; 63 Tony Jerod-Eddie DE; 93 Chris Jones DE; 96 Zach Moore DE; 64 Mike Purcell NT	Linebackers (LB): 45 Carl Bradford ILB; 55 Ahmad Brooks OLB; 95 Tank Carradine OLB; 58 Eli Harold OLB; 51 Gerald Hodges ILB; 59 Aaron Lynch OLB; 48 Wynton McManis OLB; 57 Michael Wilhoite ILB; Defensive backs (DB): 46 Marcus Ball SS; 41 Antoine Bethea SS; 26 Tramaine Brock CB; 20 Marcus Cromartie CB; 30 Prince Charles Iworah CB; 36 Dontae Johnson CB; 27 Keith Reaser CB; 33 Rashard Robinson CB; 38 JaCorey Shepherd CB; 40 Vinnie Sunseri SS; 29 Jaquiski Tartt FS; Special teams (ST): 4 Phil Dawson K; 5 Bradley Pinion P; 86 Kyle Nelson LS	Practice squad: 83 DiAndre Campbell WR; 44 Brandon Chubb OLB; 60 Fahn Cooper T (IR); 19 Mose Frazier WR; 47 Curtis Grant LB; 76 Colin Kelly T; 78 Norman Price G; 44 Duke Thomas CB; 69 Mitchell Van Dyk T; Reserve: 91 Arik Armstead DE (IR); 54 Ray-Ray Armstrong OLB (IR); 84 Blake Bell TE (IR); 50 Nick Bellore ILB (IR); 53 NaVorro Bowman ILB (IR); 43 Chris Davis CB (IR); 10 Bruce Ellington WR (IR); 28 Carlos Hyde RB (IR); 67 Daniel Kilgore C (IR); 9 Thad Lewis QB (IR); 66 Marcus Martin C (IR); 89 Vance McDonald TE (IR); 11 Quinton Patton WR (IR); 23 Will Redmond CB (IR); 35 Eric Reid FS (IR); 3 Eric Rogers WR (IR); 56 Shayne Skov OLB (IR); 82 Torrey Smith WR (IR); 25 Jimmie Ward CB (IR); Rookies in italics 53 active, 20 reserve, 8 practice squad

== Preseason ==
The 49ers' preseason opponents and schedule were announced April 7, 2016.

Week	Date	Opponent	Result	Record	Venue	Recap
1	August 14	Houston Texans	L 13–24	0–1	Levi's Stadium	Recap
2	August 20	at Denver Broncos	W 31–24	1–1	Sports Authority Field at Mile High	Recap
3	August 26	Green Bay Packers	L 10–21	1–2	Levi's Stadium	Recap
4	September 1	at San Diego Chargers	W 31–21	2–2	Qualcomm Stadium	Recap

== Regular season ==
=== Schedule ===
Week	Date	Opponent	Result	Record	Venue	Recap
1	September 12	**Los Angeles Rams**	**W** 28–0	1–0	Levi's Stadium	Recap
2	September 18	at Carolina Panthers	**L** 27–46	1–1	Bank of America Stadium	Recap
3	September 25	at **Seattle Seahawks**	**L** 18–37	1–2	CenturyLink Field	Recap
4	October 2	Dallas Cowboys	**L** 17–24	1–3	Levi's Stadium	Recap
5	October 6	**Arizona Cardinals**	**L** 21–33	1–4	Levi's Stadium	Recap
6	October 16	at Buffalo Bills	**L** 16–45	1–5	New Era Field	Recap
7	October 23	Tampa Bay Buccaneers	**L** 17–34	1–6	Levi's Stadium	Recap
8	Bye					
9	November 6	New Orleans Saints	**L** 23–41	1–7	Levi's Stadium	Recap
10	November 13	at **Arizona Cardinals**	**L** 20–23	1–8	University of Phoenix Stadium	Recap
11	November 20	New England Patriots	**L** 17–30	1–9	Levi's Stadium	Recap
12	November 27	at Miami Dolphins	**L** 24–31	1–10	Hard Rock Stadium	Recap
13	December 4	at Chicago Bears	**L** 6–26	1–11	Soldier Field	Recap
14	December 11	New York Jets	**L** 17–23 (OT)	1–12	Levi's Stadium	Recap
15	December 18	at Atlanta Falcons	**L** 13–41	1–13	Georgia Dome	Recap
16	December 24	at **Los Angeles Rams**	**W** 22–21	2–13	Los Angeles Memorial Coliseum	Recap
17	January 1, 2017	**Seattle Seahawks**	**L** 23–25	2–14	Levi's Stadium	Recap
Note: Intra-division opponents are in **bold** text.

=== Game summaries ===
==== Week 1: vs. Los Angeles Rams ====
Week One: Los Angeles Rams at San Francisco 49ers – Game summary

Quarter	1	2	3	4	Total
Rams	0	0	0	0	**0**
**49ers**	7	7	0	14	**28**

at Levi's Stadium, Santa Clara, California

- Date: September 12
- Game time: 7:20 p.m. PDT
- Game weather: 66 °F (19 °C), clear
- Game attendance: 70,178
- Referee: Bill Vinovich
- TV announcers (ESPN): Chris Berman, Steve Young and Lindsay Czarniak
- Recap, Gamebook

Game information

**First quarter**

- SF – Carlos Hyde 11-yard run (Phil Dawson kick), 3:24. 49ers 7–0. **Drive: 10 plays, 52 yards, 3:18.**

**Second quarter**

- SF – Shaun Draughn 3-yard run (Phil Dawson kick), 8:16. 49ers 14–0. **Drive: 9 plays, 59 yards, 2:44.**

**Third quarter**

- No scoring plays

**Fourth quarter**

- SF – Vance McDonald 8-yard pass from Blaine Gabbert (Phil Dawson kick), 12:07. 49ers 21–0. **Drive: 10 plays, 77 yards, 3:55.**
- SF – Carlos Hyde 1-yard run (Phil Dawson kick), 5:14. 49ers 28–0. **Drive: 11 plays, 80 yards, 5:51.**

**Top passers**

- LA – Case Keenum – 17/35, 130 yards, 2 INT
- SF – Blaine Gabbert – 22/35, 170 yards, TD

**Top rushers**

- LA – Todd Gurley – 17 rushes, 47 yards
- SF – Carlos Hyde – 23 rushes, 88 yards, 2 TD

**Top receivers**

- LA – Kenny Britt – 4 receptions, 67 yards
- SF – Jeremy Kerley – 7 receptions, 61 yards

49ers kicked the season off at 1-0

==== Week 2: at Carolina Panthers ====
Week Two: San Francisco 49ers at Carolina Panthers – Game summary

Quarter	1	2	3	4	Total
49ers	3	7	0	17	**27**
**Panthers**	7	10	14	15	**46**

at Bank of America Stadium, Charlotte, North Carolina

- Date: September 18
- Game time: 1:00 p.m. EDT/10:00 am. PDT
- Game weather: 82 °F (28 °C), sunny
- Game attendance: 74,143
- Referee: John Parry
- TV announcers (Fox): Chris Myers, Ronde Barber and Jennifer Hale
- Recap, Gamebook

Game information

**First quarter**

- SF – Phil Dawson 29-yard field goal, 11:21. 49ers 3–0. **Drive: 7 plays, 11 yards, 2:56.**
- CAR – Shaq Thompson 9-yard fumble return (Graham Gano kick), 4:04. Panthers 7–3.

**Second quarter**

- SF – Torrey Smith 28-yard pass from Blaine Gabbert (Phil Dawson kick), 10:02. 49ers 10–7. **Drive: 7 plays, 59 yards, 3:38.**
- CAR – Greg Olsen 78-yard pass from Cam Newton (Graham Gano kick), 9:40. Panthers 14–10. **Drive: 1 play, 78 yards, 0:22.**
- CAR – Graham Gano 39-yard field goal, 0:01. Panthers 17–10. **Drive: 6 plays, 33 yards, 0:41.**

**Third quarter**

- CAR – Kelvin Benjamin 10-yard pass from Cam Newton (Graham Gano kick), 8:38. Panthers 24–10. **Drive: 8 plays, 69 yards, 4:51.**
- CAR – Kelvin Benjamin 9-yard pass from Cam Newton (Graham Gano kick), 4:56. Panthers 31–10. **Drive: 6 plays, 75 yards, 2:54.**

**Fourth quarter**

- SF – Phil Dawson 39-yard field goal, 12:38. Panthers 31–13. **Drive: 4 plays, −4 yards, 1:23.**
- SF – Blaine Gabbert 1-yard run (Phil Dawson kick), 12:31. Panthers 31–20. **Drive: 1 play, 1 yard, 0:07.**
- CAR – Graham Gano 31-yard field goal, 8:07. Panthers 34–20. **Drive: 8 plays, 25 yards, 4:24.**
- SF – Vance McDonald 75-yard pass from Blaine Gabbert (Phil Dawson kick), 7:51. Panthers 34–27. **Drive: 2 plays, 75 yards, 0:16.**
- CAR – Graham Gano 49-yard field goal, 4:08. Panthers 37–27. **Drive: 9 plays, 40 yards, 3:43.**
- CAR – Devin Funchess 16-yard pass from Cam Newton (kick blocked), 3:31. Panthers 43–27. **Drive: 4 plays, 34 yards, 0:26.**
- CAR – Graham Gano 41-yard field goal, 1:06. Panthers 46–27. **Drive: 4 plays, 4 yards, 1:56.**

**Top passers**

- SF – Blaine Gabbert – 17/36, 243 yards, 2 TD, 2 INT
- CAR – Cam Newton – 24/40, 353 yards, 4 TD, INT

**Top rushers**

- SF – Carlos Hyde – 14 rushes, 34 yards
- CAR – Fozzy Whittaker – 16 rushes, 100 yards

**Top receivers**

- SF – Vance McDonald – 1 reception, 75 yards, TD
- CAR – Greg Olsen – 5 receptions, 122 yards, TD

With the loss, 49ers fell to 1-1

==== Week 3: at Seattle Seahawks ====
Week Three: San Francisco 49ers at Seattle Seahawks – Game summary

Quarter	1	2	3	4	Total
49ers	0	3	0	15	**18**
**Seahawks**	14	10	6	7	**37**

at CenturyLink Field, Seattle, Washington

- Date: September 25
- Game time: 1:05 pm. PDT
- Game weather: 66 °F (19 °C), sunny
- Game attendance: 69,010
- Referee: Jeff Triplette
- TV announcers (Fox): Kevin Burkhardt, John Lynch and Pam Oliver
- Recap, Gamebook

Game information

**First quarter**

- SEA – Christine Michael 41-yard run (Steven Hauschka kick), 14:24. Seahawks 7–0. **Drive: 3 plays, 75 yards, 0:43.**
- SEA – Christine Michael 4–yard run (Steven Hauschka kick), 4:11. Seahawks 14–0. **Drive: 14 plays, 62 yards, 8:24.**

**Second quarter**

- SF – Phil Dawson 22-yard field goal, 9:44. Seahawks 14–3. **Drive: 5 plays, 26 yards, 1:58.**
- SEA – Jimmy Graham 18-yard pass from Russell Wilson (Steven Hauschka kick), 8:00. Seahawks 21–3. **Drive: 4 plays, 73 yards, 1:48.**
- SEA – Steven Hauschka 33-yard field goal, 1:16. Seahawks 24–3. **Drive: 7 plays, 42 yards, 2:39.**

**Third quarter**

- SEA – Steven Hauschka 33-yard field goal, 6:56. Seahawks 27–3. **Drive: 6 plays, 12 yards, 4:08.**
- SEA – Steven Hauschka 22-yard field goal, 2:32. Seahawks 30–3. **Drive: 7 plays, 16 yards, 3:34.**

**Fourth quarter**

- SEA – Doug Baldwin 16-yard pass from Trevone Boykin (Steven Hauschka kick), 12:59. Seahawks 37–3. **Drive: 7 plays, 58 yards, 3:37.**
- SF – Carlos Hyde 8-yard run (Phil Dawson kick), 7:53. Seahawks 37–10. **Drive: 11 plays, 75 yards, 5:03.**
- SF – Carlos Hyde 8-yard run (Carlos Hyde run), 1:01. Seahawks 37–18. **Drive: 8 plays, 47 yards, 2:44.**

**Top passers**

- SF – Blaine Gabbert – 14/25, 119 yards, INT
- SEA – Russell Wilson – 15/23, 243 yards, TD

**Top rushers**

- SF – Carlos Hyde – 21 rushes, 103 yards, 2 TD
- SEA – Christine Michael – 20 rushes, 106 yards, 2 TD

**Top receivers**

- SF – Torrey Smith – 3 receptions, 35 yards
- SEA – Doug Baldwin – 8 receptions, 164 yards, TD

With the loss, 49ers fell to 1-2

==== Week 4: vs. Dallas Cowboys ====
Week Four: Dallas Cowboys at San Francisco 49ers – Game summary

Quarter	1	2	3	4	Total
**Cowboys**	0	14	7	3	**24**
49ers	7	7	3	0	**17**

at Levi's Stadium, Santa Clara, California

- Date: October 2
- Game time: 1:25 pm. PDT
- Game weather: 68 °F (20 °C), cloudy
- Game attendance: 70,178
- Referee: Terry McAulay
- TV announcers (Fox): Joe Buck, Troy Aikman and Erin Andrews
- Recap, Gamebook

Game information

**First quarter**

- SF – Jeremy Kerley 33-yard pass from Blaine Gabbert (Phil Dawson kick), 6:41. 49ers 7–0. **Drive: 9 plays, 63 yards, 3:39.**

**Second quarter**

- SF – Carlos Hyde 3-yard run (Phil Dawson kick), 13:55. 49ers 14–0. **Drive: 12 plays, 80 yards, 5:03.**
- DAL – Terrance Williams 20-yard pass from Dak Prescott (Dan Bailey kick), 2:58. 49ers 14–7. **Drive: 8 plays, 66 yards, 3:54.**
- DAL – Brice Butler 4-yard pass from Dak Prescott (Dan Bailey kick), 0:12. Tied 14–14. **Drive: 11 plays, 58 yards, 1:38.**

**Third quarter**

- SF – Phil Dawson 36-yard field goal, 12:18. 49ers 17–14. **Drive: 6 plays, 57 yards, 2:42.**
- DAL – Ezekiel Elliott 1-yard run (Dan Bailey kick), 1:08. Cowboys 21–17. **Drive: 10 plays, 78 yards, 5:49.**

**Fourth quarter**

- DAL – Dan Bailey 22-yard field goal, 4:11. Cowboys 24–17. **Drive: 11 plays, 62 yards, 6:27.**

**Top passers**

- DAL – Dak Prescott – 23/32, 245 yards, 2 TD
- SF – Blaine Gabbert – 16/23, 196 yards, TD, INT

**Top rushers**

- DAL – Ezekiel Elliott – 23 rushes, 138 yards, TD
- SF – Carlos Hyde – 15 rushes, 74 yards, TD

**Top receivers**

- DAL – Cole Beasley – 3 receptions, 66 yards
- SF – Jeremy Kerley – 6 receptions, 88 yards, TD

With the loss, 49ers fell to 1-3

==== Week 5: vs. Arizona Cardinals ====
Week Five: Arizona Cardinals at San Francisco 49ers – Game summary

Quarter	1	2	3	4	Total
**Cardinals**	0	7	14	12	**33**
49ers	0	7	7	7	**21**

at Levi's Stadium, Santa Clara, California

- Date: October 6
- Game time: 5:25 pm. PDT
- Game weather: 75 °F (24 °C), clear
- Game attendance: 70,178
- Referee: Carl Cheffers
- TV announcers (CBS/NFLN/Twitter): Jim Nantz, Phil Simms and Tracy Wolfson
- Recap, Gamebook

Game information

**First quarter**

- No scoring plays

**Second quarter**

- SF – Jeremy Kerley 9-yard pass from Blaine Gabbert (Phil Dawson kick), 4:12. 49ers 7–0. **Drive: 10 plays, 87 yards, 4:46.**
- ARI – Larry Fitzgerald 21-yard pass from Drew Stanton (Chandler Catanzaro kick), 1:40. Tied 7–7. **Drive: 1 play, 21 yards, 0:06.**

**Third quarter**

- ARI – David Johnson 4-yard run (Chandler Catanzaro kick), 12:45. Cardinals 14–7. **Drive: 4 plays, 14 yards, 2:10.**
- ARI – Larry Fitzgerald 29-yard pass from Drew Stanton (Chandler Catanzaro kick), 7:35. Cardinals 21–7. **Drive: 6 plays, 71 yards, 3:19.**
- SF – Carlos Hyde 1-yard run (Phil Dawson kick), 1:54. Cardinals 21–14. **Drive: 11 plays, 82 yards, 5:41.**

**Fourth quarter**

- ARI – Chandler Catanzaro 36-yard field goal, 13:39. Cardinals 24–14. **Drive: 4 plays, 6 yards, 1:16.**
- ARI – David Johnson 2-yard run (Chandler Catanzaro kick), 4:44. Cardinals 31–14. **Drive: 12 plays, 76 yards, 7:12.**
- SF – Blaine Gabbert 1-yard run (Phil Dawson kick), 1:52. Cardinals 31–21. **Drive: 13 plays, 75 yards, 2:52.**
- ARI – Blaine Gabbert sacked in the end zone by Calais Campbell for a safety, 1:17. Cardinals 33–21.

**Top passers**

- ARI – Drew Stanton – 11/28, 124 yards, 2 TD
- SF – Blaine Gabbert – 18/31, 162 yards, TD, 2 INT

**Top rushers**

- ARI – David Johnson – 27 rushes, 157 yards, 2 TD
- SF – Carlos Hyde – 22 rushes, 78 yards, TD

**Top receivers**

- ARI – Larry Fitzgerald – 6 receptions, 81 yards, 2 TD
- SF – Jeremy Kerley – 8 receptions, 102 yards, TD

The 49ers wore their black alternate uniforms for this game as part of Color Rush.

With the loss, 49ers fell to 1-4

==== Week 6: at Buffalo Bills ====
Week Six: San Francisco 49ers at Buffalo Bills – Game summary

Quarter	1	2	3	4	Total
49ers	3	10	0	3	**16**
**Bills**	7	10	7	21	**45**

at New Era Field, Orchard Park, New York

- Date: October 16
- Game time: 1:00 pm. EDT/10:00 am. PDT
- Game weather: 72 °F (22 °C), mostly cloudy
- Game attendance: 70,003
- Referee: Gene Steratore
- TV announcers (Fox): Dick Stockton, David Diehl and Kristina Pink
- Recap, Gamebook

Game information

**First quarter**

- SF – Phil Dawson 33-yard field goal, 5:43. 49ers 3–0. **Drive: 7 plays, 13 yards, 3:53.**
- BUF – LeSean McCoy 4-yard run (Dan Carpenter kick), 0:14. Bills 7–3. **Drive: 11 plays, 75 yards, 5:29.**

**Second quarter**

- SF – Torrey Smith 53-yard pass from Colin Kaepernick (Phil Dawson kick), 13:56. 49ers 10–7. **Drive: 4 plays, 75 yards, 1:18.**
- BUF – LeSean McCoy 12-yard run (Dan Carpenter kick), 10:18. Bills 14–10. **Drive: 7 plays, 75 yards, 3:38.**
- SF – Phil Dawson 48-yard field goal, 5:54. Bills 14–13. **Drive: 9 plays, 59 yards, 4:24.**
- BUF – Dan Carpenter 40-yard field goal, 0:21. Bills 17–13. **Drive: 14 plays, 53 yards, 5:33.**

**Third quarter**

- BUF – Justin Hunter 30-yard pass from Tyrod Taylor (Dan Carpenter kick), 2:34. Bills 24–13. **Drive: 4 plays, 60 yards, 1:55.**

**Fourth quarter**

- SF – Phil Dawson 47-yard field goal, 14:48. Bills 24–16. **Drive: 8 plays, 46 yards, 2:46.**
- BUF – LeSean McCoy 18-yard run (Dan Carpenter kick), 10:53. Bills 31–16. **Drive: 8 plays, 75 yards, 3:55.**
- BUF – Robert Woods 5-yard pass from Tyrod Taylor (Dan Carpenter kick), 10:32. Bills 38–16. **Drive: 1 play, 27 yards, 0:11.**
- BUF – Mike Gillislee 44-yard run (Dan Carpenter kick), 5:40. Bills 45–16. **Drive: 7 plays, 73 yards, 3:25.**

**Top passers**

- SF – Colin Kaepernick – 13/29, 187 yards, TD
- BUF – Tyrod Taylor – 16/25, 179 yards, 2 TD

**Top rushers**

- SF – Colin Kaepernick – 8 rushes, 66 yards
- BUF – LeSean McCoy – 19 rushes, 140 yards, 3 TD

**Top receivers**

- SF – Torrey Smith – 3 receptions, 76 yards, TD
- BUF – Charles Clay – 5 receptions, 52 yards

Days prior to Week 6, Head Coach Chip Kelly confirmed that quarterback Colin Kaepernick would start in place of Blaine Gabbert. This was Kaepernick's first start of the season.

With the loss, 49ers fell to 1-5

==== Week 7: vs. Tampa Bay Buccaneers ====
Week Seven: Tampa Bay Buccaneers at San Francisco 49ers – Game summary

Quarter	1	2	3	4	Total
**Buccaneers**	0	17	10	7	**34**
49ers	14	0	0	3	**17**

at Levi's Stadium, Santa Clara, California

- Date: October 23
- Game time: 1:05 pm. PDT
- Game weather: 68 °F (20 °C), clear
- Game attendance: 70,178
- Referee: Pete Morelli
- TV announcers (Fox): Chris Myers, Ronde Barber and Jennifer Hale
- Recap, Gamebook

Game information

**First quarter**

- SF – Mike Davis 4-yard run (Phil Dawson kick), 13:04. 49ers 7–0. **Drive 5 plays, 75 yards, 1:58.**
- SF – Shaun Draughn 17-yard pass from Colin Kaepernick (Phil Dawson kick), 0:16. 49ers 14–0. **Drive: 1 play, 17 yards, 0:08.**

**Second quarter**

- TB – Mike Evans 4-yard pass from Jameis Winston (Roberto Aguayo kick), 10:20. 49ers 14–7. **Drive: 11 plays, 94 yards, 4:54.**
- TB – Roberto Aguayo 38-yard field goal, 5:04. 49ers 14–10. **Drive: 6 plays, 57 yards, 2:39.**
- TB – Russell Shepard 19-yard pass from Jameis Winston (Roberto Aguayo kick), 0:53. Buccaneers 17–14. **Drive: 8 plays, 77 yards, 1:46.**

**Third quarter**

- TB – Roberto Aguayo 37-yard field goal, 11:02. Buccaneers 20–14. **Drive: 5 plays, 45 yards, 2:01.**
- TB – Mike Evans 5-yard pass from Jameis Winston (Roberto Aguayo kick), 6:30. Buccaneers 27–14. **Drive: 6 plays, 73 yards, 2:03.**

**Fourth quarter**

- SF – Phil Dawson 28-yard field goal, 8:12. Buccaneers 27–17. **Drive: 14 plays, 50 yards, 6:04.**
- TB – Peyton Barber 44-yard run (Roberto Aguayo kick), 4:51. Buccaneers 34–17. **Drive: 6 plays, 77 yards, 3:26.**

**Top passers**

- TB – Jameis Winston – 21/30, 269 yards, 3 TD, INT
- SF – Colin Kaepernick – 16/34, 143 yards, TD, INT

**Top rushers**

- TB – Jacquizz Rodgers – 26 rushes, 154 yards
- SF – Colin Kaepernick – 9 rushes, 84 yards

**Top receivers**

- TB – Mike Evans – 8 receptions, 96 yards, 2 TD
- SF – Shaun Draughn – 5 receptions, 37 yards, TD

With the loss, 49ers fell to 1-6

==== Week 9: vs. New Orleans Saints ====
Week Nine: New Orleans Saints at San Francisco 49ers – Game summary

Quarter	1	2	3	4	Total
**Saints**	14	17	0	10	**41**
49ers	3	17	3	0	**23**

at Levi's Stadium, Santa Clara, California

- Date: November 6
- Game time: 1:05 pm. PST
- Game weather: 70 °F (21 °C), mostly sunny
- Game attendance: 70,178
- Referee: Jerome Boger
- TV announcers (Fox): Chris Myers, Ronde Barber and Jennifer Hale
- Recap, Gamebook

Game information

**First quarter**

- SF – Phil Dawson 49-yard field goal, 9:25. 49ers 3–0. **Drive: 7 plays, 45 yards, 2:53.**
- NO – Tim Hightower 4-yard run (Wil Lutz kick), 5:11. Saints 7–3. **Drive: 10 plays, 83 yards, 4:14.**
- NO – Michael Thomas 1-yard pass from Drew Brees (Wil Lutz kick), 2:14. Saints 14–3. **Drive: 5 plays, 12 yards, 1:22.**

**Second quarter**

- NO – Mark Ingram II 5-yard pass from Drew Brees (Wil Lutz kick), 7:40. Saints 21–3. **Drive: 12 plays, 76 yards, 6:05.**
- SF – DuJuan Harris 47-yard pass from Colin Kaepernick (Phil Dawson kick), 5:56. Saints 21–10. **Drive: 4 plays, 65 yards, 1:44.**
- NO – Mark Ingram II 75-yard run (Wil Lutz kick), 5:45. Saints 28–10. **Drive: 1 play, 75 yards, 0:11.**
- SF – Phil Dawson 48-yard field goal, 3:53. Saints 28–13. **Drive: 5 plays, 37 yards, 1:52.**
- SF – Vance McDonald 65-yard pass from Colin Kaepernick (Phil Dawson kick), 1:05. Saints 28–20. **Drive: 3 plays, 72 yards, 0:42.**
- NO – Wil Lutz 26-yard field goal, 0:00. Saints 31–20. **Drive: 6 plays, 71 yards, 1:05.**

**Third quarter**

- SF – Phil Dawson 46-yard field goal, 9:07. Saints 31–23. **Drive: 6 plays, 29 yards, 1:07.**

**Fourth quarter**

- NO – Michael Thomas 32-yard pass from Drew Brees (Wil Lutz kick), 13:13. Saints 38–23. **Drive: 7 plays, 77 yards, 3:23.**
- NO – Wil Lutz 41-yard field goal, 8:52. Saints 41–23. **Drive: 10 plays, 53 yards, 4:02.**

**Top passers**

- NO – Drew Brees – 28/39, 323 yards, 3 TD
- SF – Colin Kaepernick – 24/39, 398 yards, 2 TD, INT

**Top rushers**

- NO – Mark Ingram II – 15 rushes, 158 yards, TD
- SF – DuJuan Harris – 10 rushes, 59 yards

**Top receivers**

- NO – Michael Thomas – 5 receptions, 73 yards, 2 TD
- SF – Quinton Patton – 6 receptions, 106 yards

With their 7th consecutive loss, 49ers fell to 1-7

==== Week 10: at Arizona Cardinals ====
Week Ten: San Francisco 49ers at Arizona Cardinals – Game summary

Quarter	1	2	3	4	Total
49ers	0	10	3	7	**20**
**Cardinals**	7	13	0	3	**23**

at University of Phoenix Stadium, Glendale, Arizona

- Date: November 13
- Game time: 2:25 p.m. MST/1:25 pm. PST
- Game weather: Played indoors (retractable roof closed)
- Game attendance: 65,127
- Referee: Brad Allen
- TV announcers (Fox): Chris Myers, Ronde Barber and Jennifer Hale
- Recap, Gamebook

Game information

**First quarter**

- ARI – David Johnson 3-yard pass from Carson Palmer (Chandler Catanzaro kick), 3:55. Cardinals 7–0. **Drive: 11 plays, 91 yards, 6:04.**

**Second quarter**

- ARI – David Johnson 18-yard run (Chandler Catanzaro kick), 14:42. Cardinals 14–0. **Drive: 1 play, 56 yards, 0:18.**
- SF – Jeremy Kerley 17-yard pass from Colin Kaepernick (Phil Dawson kick), 12:12. Cardinals 14–7. **Drive: 6 plays, 75 yards, 2:30.**
- ARI – Chandler Catanzaro 39-yard field goal, 8:28. Cardinals 17–7. **Drive: 8 plays, 54 yards, 3:44.**
- SF – Phil Dawson 49-yard field goal, 1:32. Cardinals 17–10. **Drive: 15 plays, 56 yards, 6:56.**
- ARI – Chandler Catanzaro 19-yard field goal, 0:00. Cardinals 20–10. **Drive: 10 plays, 81 yards, 1:32.**

**Third quarter**

- SF – Phil Dawson 53-yard field goal, 8:40. Cardinals 20–13. **Drive: 5 plays, 45 yards, 2:16.**

**Fourth quarter**

- SF – Colin Kaepernick 4-yard run (Phil Dawson kick), 1:55. Tied 20–20. **Drive: 7 plays, 57 yards, 1:18.**
- ARI – Chandler Catanzaro 34-yard field goal, 0:00. Cardinals 23–20. **Drive: 12 plays, 69 yards, 1:55.**

**Top passers**

- SF – Colin Kaepernick – 17/30, 210 yards, TD
- ARI – Carson Palmer – 30/49, 376 yards, TD, 2 INT

**Top rushers**

- SF – Colin Kaepernick – 10 rushes, 55 yards, TD
- ARI – David Johnson – 19 rushes, 55 yards, TD

**Top receivers**

- SF – Jeremy Kerley – 7 receptions, 71 yards, TD
- ARI – Larry Fitzgerald – 12 receptions, 133 yards

With the loss, 49ers fell to 1-8 and extended their losing streak to 8 games.

==== Week 11: vs. New England Patriots ====
Week Eleven: New England Patriots at San Francisco 49ers – Game summary

Quarter	1	2	3	4	Total
**Patriots**	6	7	0	17	**30**
49ers	3	7	0	7	**17**

at Levi's Stadium, Santa Clara, California

- Date: November 20
- Game time: 1:25 pm. PST
- Game weather: 64 °F (18 °C), cloudy with rain
- Game attendance: 70,178
- Referee: Jeff Triplette
- TV announcers (CBS): Greg Gumbel, Trent Green and Jamie Erdahl
- Recap, Gamebook

Game information

**First quarter**

- NE – Julian Edelman 4-yard pass from Tom Brady (kick failed, wide right), 10:10. Patriots 6–0. **Drive: 6 plays, 27 yards, 2:53.**
- SF – Phil Dawson 33-yard field goal, 2:40. Patriots 6–3. **Drive: 12 plays, 60 yards, 7:30.**

**Second quarter**

- NE – James White 9-yard pass from Tom Brady (Stephen Gostkowski kick), 14:53. Patriots 13–3. **Drive: 6 plays, 77 yards, 2:47.**
- SF – Vance McDonald 18-yard pass from Colin Kaepernick (Phil Dawson kick), 4:56. Patriots 13–10. **Drive: 8 plays, 92 yards, 4:17.**

**Third quarter**

- No scoring plays

**Fourth quarter**

- NE – Danny Amendola 5-yard pass from Tom Brady (Stephen Gostkowski kick), 14:55. Patriots 20–10. **Drive: 10 plays, 80 yards, 4:21.**
- NE – Malcolm Mitchell 56-yard pass from Tom Brady (Stephen Gostkowski kick), 10:06. Patriots 27–10. **Drive: 5 plays, 70 yards, 1:55.**
- NE – Stephen Gostkowski 38-yard field goal, 6:11. Patriots 30–10. **Drive: 8 plays, 50 yards, 3:04.**
- SF – Shaun Draughn 13-yard pass from Colin Kaepernick (Phil Dawson kick), 2:06. Patriots 30–17. **Drive: 12 plays, 75 yards, 4:05.**

**Top passers**

- NE – Tom Brady – 24/40, 280 yards, 4 TD
- SF – Colin Kaepernick – 16/30, 206 yards, 2 TD

**Top rushers**

- NE – LeGarrette Blount – 19 rushes, 125 yards
- SF – Carlos Hyde – 19 rushes, 86 yards

**Top receivers**

- NE – Malcolm Mitchell – 4 receptions, 98 yards, TD
- SF – Vance McDonald – 3 receptions, 46 yards, TD

With their 9th loss in a row, the 49ers fell to 1-9. As of 2024, this marks the 49ers last loss to New England.

==== Week 12: at Miami Dolphins ====
Week Twelve: San Francisco 49ers at Miami Dolphins – Game summary

Quarter	1	2	3	4	Total
49ers	7	0	7	10	**24**
**Dolphins**	0	14	10	7	**31**

at Hard Rock Stadium, Miami Gardens, Florida

- Date: November 27
- Game time: 1:00 pm. EST/10:00 am. PST
- Game weather: 79 °F (26 °C), partly cloudy
- Game attendance: 65,856
- Referee: Ronald Torbert
- TV announcers (Fox): Thom Brennaman, Charles Davis, Chris Spielman and Holly Sonders
- Recap, Gamebook

Game information

**First quarter**

- SF – Carlos Hyde 11-yard pass from Colin Kaepernick (Phil Dawson kick), 9:46. 49ers 7–0. **Drive: 8 plays, 62 yards, 3:30.**

**Second quarter**

- MIA – Jay Ajayi 2-yard run (Andrew Franks kick), 12:22. Tied 7–7. **Drive: 11 plays, 91 yards, 5:28.**
- MIA – Dion Sims 16-yard pass from Ryan Tannehill (Andrew Franks kick), 2:17. Dolphins 14–7. **Drive: 11 plays, 84 yards, 6:50.**

**Third quarter**

- MIA – Andrew Franks 24-yard field goal, 12:31. Dolphins 17–7. **Drive: 5 plays, 20 yards, 2:18.**
- SF – Garrett Celek 4-yard pass from Colin Kaepernick (Phil Dawson kick), 7:34. Dolphins 17–14. **Drive: 9 plays, 91 yards, 4:57.**
- MIA – Kenny Stills 43-yard pass from Ryan Tannehill (Andrew Franks kick), 1:33. Dolphins 24–14. **Drive: 5 plays, 60 yards, 1:50.**

**Fourth quarter**

- MIA – Leonte Carroo 15-yard pass from Ryan Tannehill (Andrew Franks kick), 11:31. Dolphins 31–14. **Drive: 6 plays, 67 yards, 3:23.**
- SF – Torrey Smith 1-yard pass from Colin Kaepernick (Phil Dawson kick), 7:42. Dolphins 31–21. **Drive: 8 plays, 75 yards, 3:49.**
- SF – Phil Dawson 36-yard field goal, 2:15. Dolphins 31–24. **Drive: 14 plays, 62 yards, 3:36.**

**Top passers**

- SF – Colin Kaepernick – 29/46, 296 yards, 3 TD, INT
- MIA – Ryan Tannehill – 20/30, 285 yards, 3 TD

**Top rushers**

- SF – Colin Kaepernick – 10 rushes, 113 yards
- MIA – Jay Ajayi – 18 rushes, 45 yards, TD

**Top receivers**

- SF – Vance McDonald – 4 receptions, 60 yards
- MIA – Kenny Stills – 3 receptions, 72 yards, TD

With their 10th straight loss, the 49ers fell to 1-10 and they were mathematically eliminated from postseason contention for the third consecutive season. An attempted rally by the 49ers was stopped short of the end zone in the final seconds.

==== Week 13: at Chicago Bears ====
Week Thirteen: San Francisco 49ers at Chicago Bears – Game summary

Quarter	1	2	3	4	Total
49ers	0	6	0	0	**6**
**Bears**	0	7	14	5	**26**

at Soldier Field, Chicago, Illinois

- Date: December 4
- Game time: 12:00 pm. CST/10:00 am. PST
- Game weather: 33 °F (1 °C), snow showers
- Game attendance: 59,782
- Referee: Pete Morelli
- TV announcers (Fox): Kenny Albert, Daryl Johnston and Laura Okmin
- Recap, Gamebook

Game information

**First quarter**

- No scoring plays

**Second quarter**

- SF – Phil Dawson 31-yard field goal, 6:55. 49ers 3–0. **Drive: 4 plays, 6 yards, 2:12.**
- SF – Phil Dawson 28-yard field goal, 1:56. 49ers 6–0. **Drive: 9 plays, 27 yards, 4:51.**
- CHI – Jordan Howard 1-yard run (Connor Barth kick), 0:31. Bears 7–6. **Drive: 8 plays, 81 yards, 1:25.**

**Third quarter**

- CHI – Jordan Howard 2-yard run (Connor Barth kick), 9:32. Bears 14–6. **Drive: 10 plays, 75 yards, 5:28.**
- CHI – Jordan Howard 5-yard run (Connor Barth kick), 6:19. Bears 21–6. **Drive: 4 plays, 59 yards, 2:13.**

**Fourth quarter**

- CHI – Connor Barth 45-yard field goal, 12:55. Bears 24–6. **Drive: 7 plays, 37 yards, 3:19.**
- CHI – Blaine Gabbert sacked in the end zone by Leonard Floyd for a safety, 1:55. Bears 26–6.

**Top passers**

- SF – Blaine Gabbert – 4/10, 35 yards
- CHI – Matt Barkley – 11/18, 192 yards

**Top rushers**

- SF – Carlos Hyde – 20 rushes, 92 yards
- CHI – Jordan Howard – 32 rushes, 117 yards, 3 TD

**Top receivers**

- SF – Vance McDonald – 2 receptions, 9 yards
- CHI – Josh Bellamy – 4 receptions, 93 yards

With their 11th straight loss, 49ers fell to 1-11

==== Week 14: vs. New York Jets ====
Week Fourteen: New York Jets at San Francisco 49ers – Game summary

Quarter	1	2	3	4	OT	Total
**Jets**	0	3	3	11	6	**23**
49ers	14	3	0	0	0	**17**

at Levi's Stadium, Santa Clara, California

- Date: December 11
- Game time: 1:05 pm. PST
- Game weather: 54 °F (12 °C), mostly cloudy
- Game attendance: 70,178
- Referee: Craig Wrolstad
- TV announcers (CBS): Greg Gumbel, Trent Green and Jamie Erdahl
- Recap, Gamebook

Game information

**First quarter**

- SF – Carlos Hyde 7-yard pass from Colin Kaepernick (Phil Dawson kick), 13:57. 49ers 7–0. **Drive: 1 play, 7 yards, 0:07.**
- SF – Shaun Draughn 4-yard run (Phil Dawson kick), 10:45. 49ers 14–0. **Drive: 4 plays, 81 yards, 1:49.**

**Second quarter**

- NYJ – Nick Folk 36-yard field goal, 7:28. 49ers 14–3. **Drive: 11 plays, 44 yards, 5:53.**
- SF – Phil Dawson 47-yard field goal, 5:45. 49ers 17–3. **Drive: 5 plays, 46 yards, 1:43.**

**Third quarter**

- NYJ – Nick Folk 30-yard field goal, 6:28. 49ers 17–6. **Drive: 13 plays, 64 yards, 7:25.**

**Fourth quarter**

- NYJ – Bilal Powell 5-yard run (Bryce Petty run), 5:04. 49ers 17–14. **Drive: 15 plays, 66 yards, 8:23.**
- NYJ – Nick Folk 50-yard field goal, 0:38. Tied 17–17. **Drive: 8 plays, 33 yards, 1:57.**

**Overtime**

- NYJ – Bilal Powell 19-yard run, 8:35. Jets 23–17. **Drive: 6 plays, 63 yards, 4:16.**

**Top passers**

- NYJ – Bryce Petty – 23/35, 257 yards, INT
- SF – Colin Kaepernick – 15/26, 133 yards, TD

**Top rushers**

- NYJ – Bilal Powell – 29 rushes, 145 yards, 2 TD
- SF – Carlos Hyde – 17 rushes, 193 yards

**Top receivers**

- NYJ – Robby Anderson – 6 receptions, 99 yards
- SF – Jeremy Kerley – 5 receptions, 50 yards

With their 12th consecutive loss, the 49ers fell to 1-12 and finished 0-4 against the AFC East.

==== Week 15: at Atlanta Falcons ====
Week Fifteen: San Francisco 49ers at Atlanta Falcons – Game summary

Quarter	1	2	3	4	Total
49ers	0	13	0	0	**13**
**Falcons**	21	7	10	3	**41**

at Georgia Dome, Atlanta, Georgia

- Date: December 18
- Game time: 4:05 pm. EST/1:05 pm. PST
- Game weather: Played indoors (dome stadium)
- Game attendance: 70,164
- Referee: Gene Steratore
- TV announcers (Fox): Thom Brennaman, Charles Davis, Chris Spielman and Peter Schrager
- Recap, Gamebook

Game information

**First quarter**

- ATL – Devonta Freeman 5-yard run (Matt Bryant kick), 10:31. Falcons 7–0. **Drive: 6 plays, 47 yards, 2:57.**
- ATL – Taylor Gabriel 9-yard pass from Matt Ryan (Matt Bryant kick), 7:40. Falcons 14–0. **Drive: 5 plays, 50 yards, 1:58.**
- ATL – Austin Hooper 9-yard pass from Matt Ryan (Matt Bryant kick), 0:40. Falcons 21–0. **Drive: 11 plays, 55 yards, 5:51.**

**Second quarter**

- SF – Garrett Celek 16-yard pass from Colin Kaepernick (Phil Dawson kick), 12:45. Falcons 21–7. **Drive: 6 plays, 75 yards, 2:55.**
- ATL – Devonta Freeman 9-yard run (Matt Bryant kick), 4:28. Falcons 28–7. **Drive: 6 plays, 94 yards, 3:32.**
- SF – Rod Streater 5-yard pass from Colin Kaepernick (kick failed, wide left), 0:13. Falcons 28–13. **Drive: 13 plays, 75 yards, 4:15.**

**Third quarter**

- ATL – Matt Bryant 50-yard field goal, 6:29. Falcons 31–13. **Drive: 6 plays, 25 yards, 2:50.**
- ATL – Devonta Freeman 34-yard run (Matt Bryant kick), 1:42. Falcons 38–13. **Drive: 4 plays, 77 yards, 2:16.**

**Fourth quarter**

- ATL – Matt Bryant 41-yard field goal, 1:09. Falcons 41–13. **Drive: 8 plays, 68 yards, 5:06.**

**Top passers**

- SF – Colin Kaepernick – 20/33, 183 yards, 2 TD
- ATL – Matt Ryan – 17/23, 286 yards, 2 TD

**Top rushers**

- SF – Carlos Hyde – 13 rushes, 71 yards
- ATL – Devonta Freeman – 20 rushes, 139 yards, 3 TD

**Top receivers**

- SF – Blake Bell – 1 reception, 45 yards
- ATL – Aldrick Robinson – 4 receptions, 111 yards

With another blowout loss, the 49ers extended their losing streak to 13 games and finished 0-4 against the NFC South.

==== Week 16: at Los Angeles Rams ====
Week Sixteen: San Francisco 49ers at Los Angeles Rams – Game summary

Quarter	1	2	3	4	Total
**49ers**	7	0	0	15	**22**
Rams	14	0	0	7	**21**

at Los Angeles Memorial Coliseum, Los Angeles, California

- Date: December 24
- Game time: 1:25 pm. PST
- Game weather: 59 °F (15 °C), partly cloudy
- Game attendance: 83,656
- Referee: Walt Anderson
- TV announcers (Fox): Chris Myers, Ronde Barber and Jennifer Hale
- Recap, Gamebook

Game information

**First quarter**

- SF – Carlos Hyde 19-yard pass from Colin Kaepernick (Phil Dawson kick), 9:01. 49ers 7–0. **Drive: 2 plays, 17 yards, 0:37.**
- LA – Todd Gurley 1-yard run (Greg Zuerlein kick), 4:07. Tied 7–7. **Drive: 9 plays, 52 yards, 4:54.**
- LA – Tavon Austin 30-yard run (Greg Zuerlein kick), 2:33. Rams 14–7. **Drive: 1 play, 30 yards, 0:08.**

**Second quarter**

- No scoring plays

**Third quarter**

- No scoring plays

**Fourth quarter**

- LA – Tyler Higbee 2-yard pass from Jared Goff (Greg Zuerlein kick), 10:32. Rams 21–7. **Drive: 4 plays, 25 yards, 2:13.**
- SF – Colin Kaepernick 13-yard run (Phil Dawson kick), 5:06. Rams 21–14. **Drive: 13 plays, 75 yards, 5:26.**
- SF – Rod Streater 10-yard pass from Colin Kaepernick (Colin Kaepernick run), 0:31. 49ers 22–21. **Drive: 10 plays, 73 yards, 2:39.**

**Top passers**

- SF – Colin Kaepernick – 28/38, 266 yards, 2 TD, INT
- LA – Jared Goff – 11/24, 90 yards, TD, 2 INT

**Top rushers**

- SF – Carlos Hyde – 13 rushes, 38 yards
- LA – Todd Gurley – 23 rushes, 67 yards, TD

**Top receivers**

- SF – Rod Streater – 6 receptions, 63 yards, TD
- LA – Lance Kendricks – 3 receptions, 36 yards

With the win, the 49ers snapped their 13-game losing streak and swept the Rams on the season, while going 0–13 against the rest of the league. With the Cleveland Browns standing 0–14 before this week, the 49ers win also ended the possibility of two teams finishing 1–15 for the first time, or becoming the first team since the 2001 Carolina Panthers to win their opener and lose the remainder of their games.

==== Week 17: vs. Seattle Seahawks ====
Week Seventeen: Seattle Seahawks at San Francisco 49ers – Game summary

Quarter	1	2	3	4	Total
**Seahawks**	3	16	3	3	**25**
49ers	7	7	2	7	**23**

at Levi's Stadium, Santa Clara, California

- Date: January 1, 2017
- Game time: 1:25 pm. PST
- Game weather: 54 °F (12 °C), clear
- Game attendance: 70,178
- Referee: Tony Corrente
- TV announcers (Fox): Joe Davis, Brady Quinn and Holly Sonders
- Recap, Gamebook

Game information

**First quarter**

- SEA – Steven Hauschka 31-yard field goal, 13:03. Seahawks 3–0. **Drive: 4 plays, 8 yards, 1:16.**
- SF – Shaun Draughn 1-yard run (Phil Dawson kick), 9:35. 49ers 7–3. **Drive: 7 plays, 75 yards, 3:28.**

**Second quarter**

- SF – Shaun Draughn 1-yard run (Phil Dawson kick), 14:56. 49ers 14–3. **Drive: 14 plays, 79 yards, 8:10.**
- SEA – Steven Hauschka 32-yard field goal, 10:32. 49ers 14–6. **Drive: 9 plays, 46 yards, 4:24.**
- SEA – Luke Willson 11-yard pass from Russell Wilson (Steven Hauschka kick), 6:55. 49ers 14–13. **Drive: 2 plays, 15 yards, 0:49.**
- SEA – Thomas Rawls 1-yard run (kick blocked), 3:00. Seahawks 19–14. **Drive: 5 plays, 91 yards, 1:50.**

**Third quarter**

- SEA – Steven Hauschka 33-yard field goal, 8:14. Seahawks 22–14. **Drive: 6 plays, 44 yards, 1:47.**
- SF – Nolan Frese fumble out of bounds in the end zone for a safety, 5:04. Seahawks 22–16.

**Fourth quarter**

- SEA – Steven Hauschka 28-yard field goal, 14:08. Seahawks 25–16. **Drive: 9 plays, 62 yards, 3:58.**
- SF – Garrett Celek 9-yard pass from Colin Kaepernick (Phil Dawson kick), 5:42. Seahawks 25–23. **Drive: 4 plays, 35 yards, 2:22.**

**Top passers**

- SEA – Russell Wilson – 19/32, 258 yards, TD
- SF – Colin Kaepernick – 17/22, 215 yards, TD

**Top rushers**

- SEA – Alex Collins – 7 rushes, 55 yards
- SF – Shaun Draughn – 21 rushes, 41 yards, 2 TD

**Top receivers**

- SEA – Jimmy Graham – 4 receptions, 64 yards
- SF – Jeremy Kerley – 6 receptions, 61 yards

With the loss, the 49ers ended their season 2–14, their worst record since 2004. This was Colin Kaepernick's last game as a 49er.

== Standings ==
=== Division ===
NFC West
	W	L	T	PCT	DIV	CONF	PF	PA	STK
^{(3)} Seattle Seahawks	10	5	1	.656	3–2–1	6–5–1	354	292	W1
Arizona Cardinals	7	8	1	.469	4–1–1	6–5–1	418	362	W2
Los Angeles Rams	4	12	0	.250	2–4	3–9	224	394	L7
San Francisco 49ers	2	14	0	.125	2–4	2–10	309	480	L1

=== Conference ===
NFC
#	Team	Division	W	L	T	PCT	DIV	CONF	SOS	SOV	STK
Division leaders
1	Dallas Cowboys	East	13	3	0	.813	3–3	9–3	.471	.440	L1
2	Atlanta Falcons	South	11	5	0	.688	5–1	9–3	.480	.452	W4
3	Seattle Seahawks	West	10	5	1	.656	3–2–1	6–5–1	.441	.425	W1
4	Green Bay Packers	North	10	6	0	.625	5–1	8–4	.508	.453	W6
Wild Cards
5	New York Giants	East	11	5	0	.688	4–2	8–4	.486	.455	W1
6 (Note: Detroit finished ahead of Tampa Bay for the No. 6 seed and qualified for the last playoff spot based on record vs. common opponents—Detroit's cumulative record against Chicago, Dallas, Los Angeles and New Orleans was 3–2, while Tampa Bay's cumulative record against the same four teams was 2–3.)	Detroit Lions	North	9	7	0	.563	3–3	7–5	.475	.392	L3
Did not qualify for the postseason
7	Tampa Bay Buccaneers	South	9	7	0	.563	4–2	7–5	.492	.434	W1
8	Washington Redskins	East	8	7	1	.531	3–3	6–6	.516	.430	L1
9	Minnesota Vikings	North	8	8	0	.500	2–4	5–7	.492	.457	W1
10	Arizona Cardinals	West	7	8	1	.469	4–1–1	6–5–1	.463	.366	W2
11 (Note: New Orleans finished ahead of Philadelphia based on better record vs. conference opponents.)	New Orleans Saints	South	7	9	0	.438	2–4	6–6	.523	.393	L1
12	Philadelphia Eagles	East	7	9	0	.438	2–4	5–7	.559	.518	W2
13	Carolina Panthers	South	6	10	0	.375	1–5	5–7	.518	.354	L2
14	Los Angeles Rams	West	4	12	0	.250	2–4	3–9	.504	.500	L7
15	Chicago Bears	North	3	13	0	.188	2–4	3–9	.521	.396	L4
16	San Francisco 49ers	West	2	14	0	.125	2–4	2–10	.504	.250	L1
Tiebreakers (Note: When breaking ties for three or more teams under the NFL's rules, they are first broken within divisions, then comparing only the highest-ranked remaining team from each division.)

== See also ==
- List of organizational conflicts in the NFL
