= Cofield =

Cofield may refer to:

- Barry Cofield, American football player
- Bill Cofield, American college basketball coach
- Takoby Cofield (born 1992), Canadian football player
- Cofield, North Carolina
