= Tarboro High School =

School in North Carolina, United States

Coordinates: 35°54′5″N 77°33′31″W

Location
- 1400 Howard. Avenue; Tarboro, North Carolina 27886; United States

Information
- School type: Public
- Established: 1881
- School district: Edgecombe County Public Schools
- NCES District ID: 3701320
- NCES School ID: 370132001770
- Principal: Terry Hopkins
- Teaching staff: 30.00 (on an FTE basis)
- Grades: 9-12
- Enrollment: 506 (2023-2024)
- Student to teacher ratio: 16.87
- Colors: Purple, Yellow, White
- Mascot: Viking
- Website: ths.ecps.us

Tarboro High School is a high school in Tarboro, North Carolina. It is one of four high schools in the Edgecombe County Public Schools district.

== History ==
Tarboro High School was first established in 1881. Tarboro Colored School, which became known as W. A. Pattillo High School, served Tarboro's African American students. The schools merged and its teams integrated in 1970.

In the 1970s the school had a high number of suspensions, affecting the academic performance of students. To address the issue, it became one of the earliest schools in the North Carolina and Virginia area to use in-school suspension in place of the traditional out of school suspension.

Edgecombe County Public Schools was established in 1993.

In 1999, the school served as a temporary shelter for thousands of people affected by Hurricane Floyd. Vice President Al Gore was the commencement speaker for Tarboro High School's graduation ceremony in 2000. He praised the students for helping with the shelter during the aftermath of Hurricane Floyd, calling them "American heroes".

== Athletics ==
Vikings are the school mascot and the school colors are purple, yellow, and white.

=== Sporting achievements ===
Tarboro has won 10 football state championships. In 2021, the football team won its fourth state championship in five seasons.

The boys' track and field team won back-to-back state championships in 1973 and 1974, led by coach Carter Ray Suggs.

== Demographics ==
The demographic breakdown of the 551 students enrolled in the 2020-2021 school year was:

- Black - 76.7%
- Hispanic - 7.5%
- White - 14.1%
- Two or more races - 1.7%

== Notable alumni ==
- Kelvin Bryant, NFL running back and Super Bowl XXII champion with the Washington Redskins
- Mike Caldwell, MLB pitcher, member of Milwaukee Brewers Wall of Honor
- Takoby Cofield, former professional football player and coach
- Shaun Draughn, NFL running back
- Donald Frank, NFL cornerback
- Todd Gurley, NFL running back, 3-time Pro Bowl selection and 2-time First-team All-Pro with the St. Louis/Los Angeles Rams
- Bill Hull, NFL defensive end
- Tyquan Lewis, NFL defensive end
