= Garrett Celek =

American football player (born 1988)

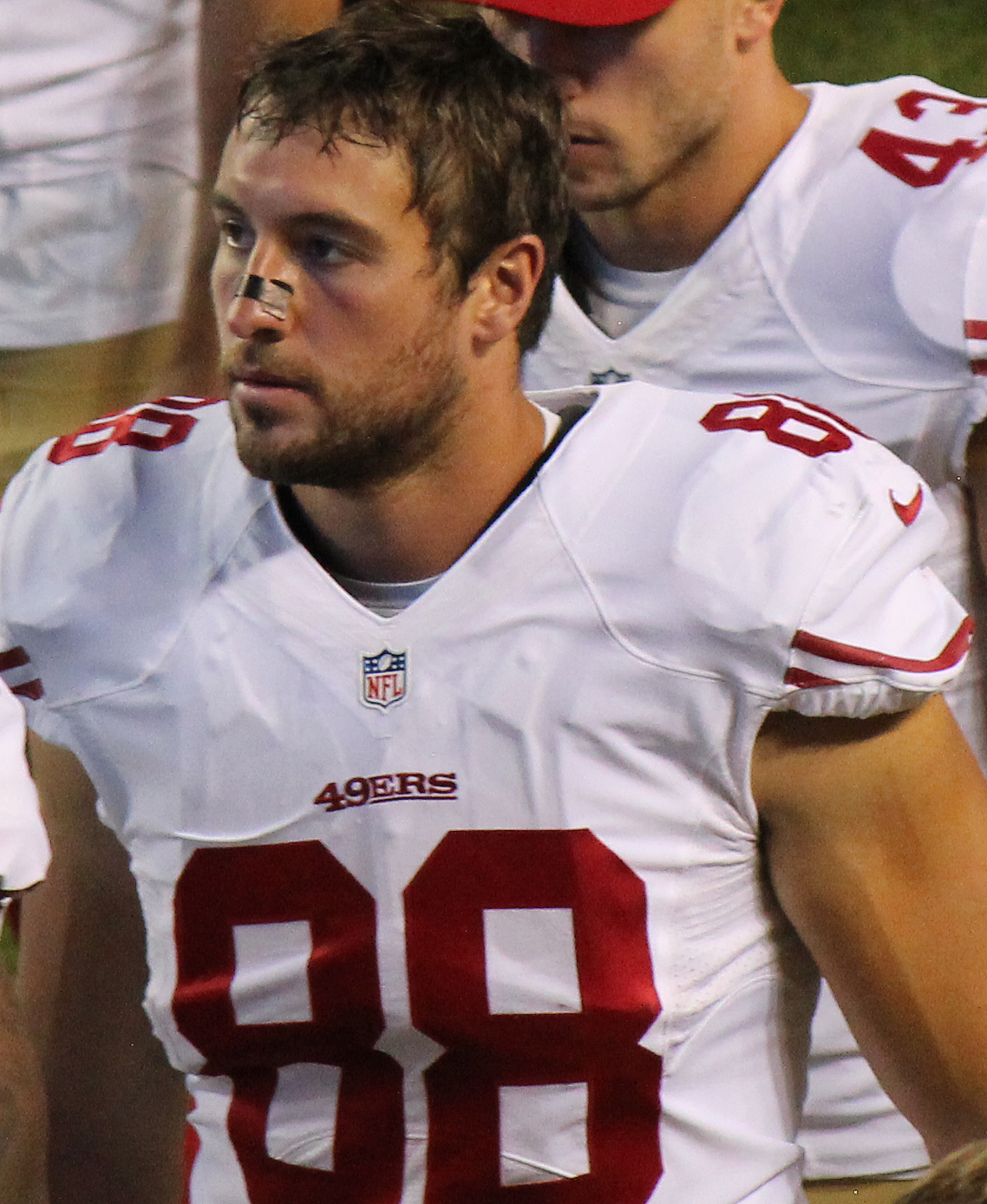
- Celek with the San Francisco 49ers in 2015

No. 81, 88
- Position: Tight end

Personal information
- Born: May 29, 1988 (age 38); Cincinnati, Ohio, U.S.
- Listed height: 6 ft 5 in (1.96 m)
- Listed weight: 252 lb (114 kg)

Career information
- High school: La Salle (Cincinnati)
- College: Michigan State (2007–2011)
- NFL draft: 2012: undrafted

Career history
- San Francisco 49ers (2012–2019)

Career NFL statistics
- Receptions: 82
- Receiving yards: 1,104
- Receiving touchdowns: 12
- Stats at Pro Football Reference

Garrett Bartholomew Celek (born May 29, 1988) is an American former professional football player who spent his entire career as a tight end for the San Francisco 49ers of the National Football League (NFL). He played college football for the Michigan State Spartans. Celek signed with the 49ers as an undrafted free agent in 2012. He is the brother of former Philadelphia Eagles tight end Brent Celek.

== Early life ==
Celek attended La Salle High School in Cincinnati, Ohio, where he played on the football team and was selected to the PrepStar's All-Midwest Team.

== College career ==
In his freshman year, he played in 12 games, notching 6 receptions, 50 receiving yards, and a receiving touchdown. On September 20, 2008, he caught 2 receptions for 15 yards against Notre Dame to help Michigan State win the game, 23–7.

In his sophomore year, he played in 10 games and he recorded 3 receptions for 33 yards and a touchdown. On October 10, 2009, he had 2 receptions for 20 yards against Illinois, in a 24–14 Michigan State victory.

In his junior year, he played in the first two games on the season, with his performance of September 11, 2010, against Florida Atlantic netting his season total of 2 receptions and 17 receiving yards against as Michigan State won, 30–17.

In his senior year, he played in 14 games and recorded 3 receptions, 35 receiving yards, and one receiving touchdown. On September 10, 2011, he had one reception for 8 yards and a touchdown against Florida Atlantic as Michigan State won, 44–0.

In his college career, he played four seasons at Michigan State. He played in 38 games, including 12 starts. He recorded 14 receptions, 135 receiving yards, and 3 receiving touchdowns during his tenure.

== Professional career ==
=== Pre-draft ===
Coming out of college, Celek was projected by NFL Draft experts and analysts from NFL.com and DraftScout.com to be drafted in the sixth or seventh round. He was rated as the 13th-best tight end available in the Draft, out of the 73 available by DraftScout.com. Although he was not invited to the NFL Scouting Combine, he did participate at Cincinnati's Pro Day.

Pre-draft measurables
Height	Weight	40-yard dash	10-yard split	20-yard split	20-yard shuttle	Three-cone drill	Vertical jump	Broad jump	Bench press
6 ft 4 3/8 in (1.94 m)	250 lb (113 kg)	4.72 s	1.66 s	2.67 s	4.49 s	7.12 s	34 in (0.86 m)	9 ft 11 in (3.02 m)	19 reps
All values from Cincinnati's Pro Day

=== 2012 season ===
On April 29, 2012, the San Francisco 49ers signed Celek as an undrafted free agent after he went unselected in the 2012 NFL draft. He was signed to a three-year, $1.44 million contract. On September 1, 2012, he earned a spot on the 53-man roster. He began his rookie season as the fourth tight end on the depth chart behind veteran Vernon Davis, Delanie Walker, and Demarcus Dobbs. On October 7, 2012, he made his first career reception against the Buffalo Bills after making his debut against the New York Jets the previous week. He finished his rookie season with four catches for 51 receiving yards and appeared in 13 regular-season contests. The 49ers finished with an 11–4–1 record in his rookie year and he appeared in Super Bowl XLVII, losing to the Baltimore Ravens.

=== 2013 season ===
During the offseason, the San Francisco 49ers acquired wide receiver Anquan Boldin in a trade with the Baltimore Ravens. Celek gave the No. 81 jersey he wore as a rookie to Boldin as Boldin had worn it his entire career.

Celek began the 2013 regular season as the third tight end behind veteran Vernon Davis and rookie Vance McDonald. He appeared in the season opener and started the following week, but did not make his first catch of the season until Week 3. During that game he only made one reception for 30 yards in the 49ers' 7–27 loss to the Indianapolis Colts. Celek finished his second season with two catches for 38 yards in 12 games and one start. On January 5, 2014, he made his first career catch in the postseason after catching a pass from Colin Kaepernick and taking it for six yards during a victory over the Green Bay Packers. The San Francisco 49ers made it to the NFC Championship game that season, but lost to the eventual Super Bowl champions, the Seattle Seahawks, by a score of 23–17.

=== 2014 season ===
Celek started the 2014 season, missing the first 11 games with back and hamstring injuries. On November 27, he started his first game of the season during a loss to the Seattle Seahawks. The next game, he made his first catch of the season and finished with one reception for 22 yards during a 24–13 loss to the Oakland Raiders. After returning, Celek was placed on injured reserve after suffering an ankle injury during a Week 15 loss to the Seahawks. Celek was limited to two receptions and 53 receiving yards during the 2014 season and started one game while only appearing in three.

=== 2015 season ===
On March 7, 2015, Celek signed a one-year, $710,000 contract to remain with the 49ers. The contract also included a $25,000 signing bonus.

Celek began his first season under new head coach Jim Tomsula remaining as the third tight end behind both Davis and McDonald. He started the 49ers' season opener against the Minnesota Vikings, finishing the 20–3 win with a season-high three receptions and 40 receiving yards. On October 11, 2015, against the New York Giants, Celek caught a 5-yard reception from Colin Kaepernick for his first NFL touchdown. On November 8, 2015, he caught two passes for 12 yards and a season-high two touchdowns during a 17–16 victory over the Atlanta Falcons. Celek finished 2015 with a total of 19 receptions, 186 receiving yards, and three touchdown receptions while starting 8 games and appearing in 11.

=== 2016 season ===
On February 24, 2016, the 49ers signed Celek to a four-year, $10.20 million contract with $3.50 million guaranteed and a signing bonus of $2.50 million.

In his first season under new head coach Chip Kelly, Celek was named the second tight end behind Vance McDonald to begin the season. In the season-opening 28–0 victory over the Los Angeles Rams, Celek made one reception for 15 yards. On October 2, 2016, he made a career-high five receptions for a career-high 79 receiving yards during the 49ers' 24–17 loss to the Dallas Cowboys. On November 27, he caught two passes for 19 yards and a 4-yard touchdown pass from Colin Kaepernick for his first touchdown of the season during a 24–31 loss to the Miami Dolphins. Celek finished the season with 29 receptions for 350 receiving yards and three touchdowns in 16 games and six starts.

=== 2017 season ===
In 2017, Celek recorded 21 receptions for 336 yards and four touchdowns as the 49ers finished with a 6–10 record.

=== 2018 season ===
In 2018, Celek recorded five receptions for 90 yards and two touchdowns as the 49ers finished with a 4–12 record.

=== 2019 season ===
On August 31, 2019, Celek was placed on reserve/PUP to begin the season. He was activated on November 11, 2019 prior to Week 10. He was placed on injured reserve on December 12, 2019. Without Celek, the 49ers reached Super Bowl LIV, but lost 31–20 to the Kansas City Chiefs.

=== Retirement ===
On February 7, 2020, Celek announced his retirement from the NFL via Instagram.

=== NFL statistics ===
==== Regular season ====
Year	Team	Games		Receiving					Rushing					Fumbles	
Year	Team	GP	GS	Rec	Yds	Avg	Lng	TD	Att	Yds	Avg	Lng	TD	Fum	Lost
2012	SF	13	0	4	51	12.8	35	0	—	—	—	—	—	0	0
2013	SF	12	1	2	38	19.0	26	0	—	—	—	—	—	1	0
2014	SF	3	1	2	53	26.5	31	0	—	—	—	—	—	0	0
2015	SF	11	8	19	186	9.8	33	3	—	—	—	—	—	0	0
2016	SF	16	6	29	350	12.1	31	3	—	—	—	—	—	2	1
2017	SF	16	13	21	336	16.0	61	4	—	—	—	—	—	0	0
2018	SF	15	1	5	90	18.3	41T	2	—	—	—	—	—	0	0
2019	SF	5	1	0	0	0.0	0	0	—	—	—	—	—	0	0
Career		91	31	82	1,104	13.5	61	12	0	0	0.0	0	0	3	1

==== Postseason ====
Year	Team	Games		Receiving					Rushing					Fumbles	
Year	Team	GP	GS	Rec	Yds	Avg	Lng	TD	Att	Yds	Avg	Lng	TD	Fum	Lost
2012	SF	3	0	0	0	0.0	0	0	—	—	—	—	—	0	0
2013	SF	3	0	1	6	6.0	6	0	—	—	—	—	—	0	0
2019	SF	0	0	Did not play due to injury											
Career		6	0	1	6	6.0	6	0	0	0	0.0	0	0	0	0

== Personal life ==
Celek is the son of Steve and Debbie Celek and is one of six children. He is the younger brother of former Philadelphia Eagles tight end Brent Celek, who also played under former San Francisco 49ers' head coach Chip Kelly in Philadelphia.
