= Alex Balducci =

American football player (born 1994)

No. 56, 75, 62, 60, 77, 65
- Position: Guard

Personal information
- Born: March 1, 1994 (age 32); Portland, Oregon, U.S.
- Listed height: 6 ft 4 in (1.93 m)
- Listed weight: 310 lb (141 kg)

Career information
- High school: Central Catholic (Portland)
- College: Oregon
- NFL draft: 2016: undrafted

Career history
- San Francisco 49ers (2016); New York Jets (2017)*; Washington Redskins (2017–2018)*; New York Jets (2018)*; Arizona Hotshots (2019); Dallas Renegades (2020)
- * Offseason or practice squad member only

Career NFL statistics
- Games played: 2
- Stats at Pro Football Reference

Alex Balducci (born March 1, 1994) is an American former professional football player who was a guard in the National Football League (NFL). He played college football for the Oregon Ducks, and signed with the San Francisco 49ers as an undrafted free agent in 2016.

== College career ==
Balducci played nose tackle for Ducks at the University of Oregon from 2012 to 2015. As a redshirt freshman in 2012, he sat out the first ten games but played the last four games after many injuries to the defensive line. As a freshman, he played under his future 49ers head coach Chip Kelly. On November 10, 2012, he made his collegiate debut in a 19–17 victory over California. He got his first collegiate start the following week against Stanford. On November 24, 2012, he made his first career tackle during a 48–24 victory over No. 16 Oregon State. He finished his freshman season with one tackle in four games.

The following year, he played in 10 games during his sophomore season and made 18 combined tackles. As a junior, he played in ten games, made 18 total tackles, three tackles for a loss, and a sack. In 2015, Balducci played in all 13 games and had a career-high 40 combined tackles, 7.5 tackles for a loss, and 3.5 sacks.

== Professional career ==
Pre-draft measurables
Height	Weight	40-yard dash	10-yard split	20-yard split	20-yard shuttle	Three-cone drill	Vertical jump	Broad jump	Bench press
6 ft 4 3/4 in (1.95 m)	310 lb (141 kg)	5.01 s	1.70 s	2.90 s	4.63 s	7.55 s	33 in (0.84 m)	9 ft 5 in (2.87 m)	25 reps
All values from Oregon's Pro Day

=== San Francisco 49ers ===
On May 6, 2016, the San Francisco 49ers signed Balducci to a three-year, $1.35 million undrafted free agent contract with $57,500 guaranteed and a signing bonus of $12,500. This reunited him with his former head coach at Oregon and former 49ers' head coach Chip Kelly. Throughout mini-camps, Kelly and the 49ers' coaching staff worked with Balducci in an attempt to convert him into an offensive lineman. On September 3, 2016, he was waived by the 49ers as a part of their final roster cuts. The next day, he was signed to their practice squad. On December 12, 2016, the 49ers promoted Balducci to the active roster after a season-ending injury to Daniel Kilgore and an injury to Fahn Cooper.

On December 24, 2016, he made his professional regular season debut in the 49ers' 22–21 victory over the Los Angeles Rams. The following week, he played in the 49ers' 25–23 loss to the Seattle Seahawks. He finished his rookie season appearing in two games.

On May 2, 2017, Balducci was waived by the 49ers.

=== New York Jets (first stint) ===
On May 3, 2017, Balducci was claimed off waivers by the New York Jets. He was waived on September 2, 2017.

=== Washington Redskins ===
On September 11, 2017, Balducci was signed to the Washington Redskins' practice squad. He signed a reserve/future contract with the Redskins on January 1, 2018. He was waived on August 1, 2018.

=== New York Jets (second stint) ===
On August 6, 2018, Balducci signed with the New York Jets. He was waived on August 31, 2018.

=== Arizona Hotshots ===
Balducci signed a contract with the Arizona Hotshots of the Alliance of American Football (AAF) on March 25, 2019, while on the team's rights list. He was activated from the rights list on March 26. The league ceased operations in April 2019.

=== Dallas Renegades ===
Balducci was selected in the 5th round in phase two in the 2020 XFL draft by the Dallas Renegades. He had his contract terminated when the league suspended operations on April 10, 2020.

== Personal life ==
Balducci was raised by his parents, Ralph and Kathy Balducci, and has one sister, Kristin.
