= Carlos Hyde =

American football player (born 1990)

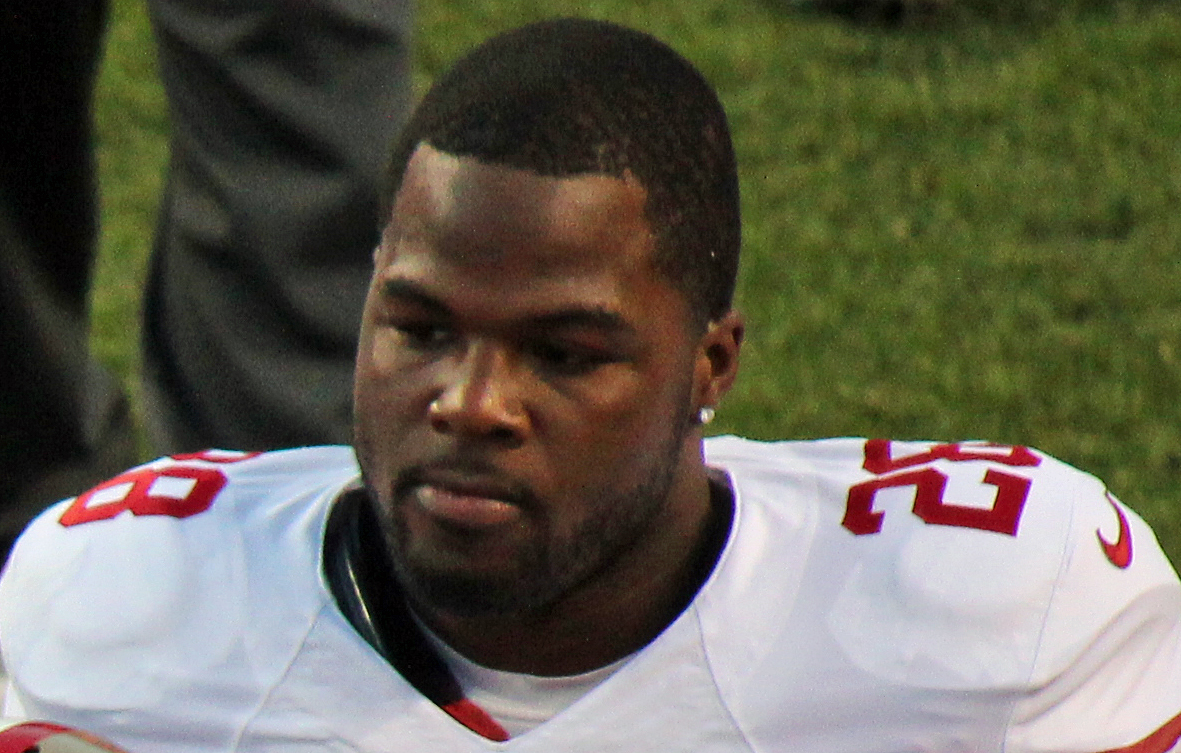
- Hyde with the San Francisco 49ers in 2014

No. 28, 34, 23, 30, 24
- Position: Running back

Personal information
- Born: September 20, 1990 (age 36); Cincinnati, Ohio, U.S.
- Listed height: 6 ft 0 in (1.83 m)
- Listed weight: 230 lb (104 kg)

Career information
- High school: Naples (Naples, Florida)
- College: Ohio State (2010–2013)
- NFL draft: 2014: 2nd round, 57th overall pick

Career history
- San Francisco 49ers (2014–2017); Cleveland Browns (2018); Jacksonville Jaguars (2018); Kansas City Chiefs (2019)*; Houston Texans (2019); Seattle Seahawks (2020); Jacksonville Jaguars (2021)
- * Offseason or practice squad member only

Awards and highlights
- Big Ten Running Back of the Year (2013); First-team All-Big Ten (2013); Second-team All-Big Ten (2012)

Career NFL statistics
- Rushing yards: 4,979
- Rushing average: 4.1
- Rushing touchdowns: 37
- Receptions: 157
- Receiving yards: 867
- Receiving touchdowns: 3
- Stats at Pro Football Reference

Carlos Hyde (born September 20, 1990) is an American former professional football player who was a running back in the National Football League (NFL). He played college football for the Ohio State Buckeyes and was selected by the San Francisco 49ers in the second round of the 2014 NFL draft.

== Early life ==
Hyde grew up in Cincinnati, Ohio. He attended Princeton High School in Sharonville, Ohio, for his freshman year. He then moved to Naples, Florida, and attended Naples High School for the remainder of high school. He rushed for 1,653 yards and 16 touchdowns for the football team as a senior, and was named Player of the Year after his senior season by both the Naples Daily News and the Ft. Myers News-Press. He played on the 2007 Naples state championship winning team and 2008 regional finalist. He also played basketball, ran track, and mentored elementary school children.

Considered a four-star recruit by Rivals.com, he was rated as the second best fullback in the nation. He committed to Ohio State University over scholarship offers from the University of Florida, the University of Miami, and Florida State University.

== College career ==
Hyde enrolled at Ohio State in January 2010. Hyde played primarily as a backup running back in his first two seasons before breaking out in his junior season with 970 yards and 16 rushing touchdowns in less than 10 games after missing two because of an ankle issue. He was named second-team All-Big Ten Conference that year.

Going into his senior season with high expectations, Hyde was suspended for the first three games of the season after being implicated in an incident at a local bar, though he was not criminally charged in the matter. Hyde returned from his suspension to finish the season strong with 1,282 yards and 14 touchdowns over his last eight games. On October 5, Hyde ran for his first 100-yard and multi-touchdown game of the season when he ran for 168 yards and three touchdowns when the Buckeyes played Northwestern. Hyde ran for a season-high of 246 yards and four touchdowns against Illinois on November 16. He followed that up with 226 rushing yards and a touchdown in the annual rivalry game against Michigan. He was a first-team All-Big Ten selection, and a third-team All-American by the Associated Press.

== Professional career ==
Pre-draft measurables
Height	Weight	Arm length	Hand span	Wingspan	40-yard dash	10-yard split	20-yard split	Vertical jump	Broad jump	Bench press	Wonderlic
5 ft 11 7/8 in (1.83 m)	230 lb (104 kg)	32 in (0.81 m)	9 5/8 in (0.24 m)	6 ft 5 3/4 in (1.97 m)	4.66 s	1.69 s	2.77 s	34.5 in (0.88 m)	9 ft 6 in (2.90 m)	19 reps	9
All values from NFL Combine

=== San Francisco 49ers ===
==== 2014 season ====
Hyde was selected by the San Francisco 49ers in the second round (57th overall) of the 2014 NFL draft. He was the third running back to be selected in the 2014 NFL draft after Bishop Sankey, who was selected by the Tennessee Titans, and Jeremy Hill, who was selected by the Cincinnati Bengals.

There were large expectations for Hyde coming into an already crowded backfield. With a large amount of depth at the position, Hyde had to compete against Kendall Hunter, LaMichael James, Marcus Lattimore, and 49ers all-time leading rusher, Frank Gore. A series of injuries would move Hyde up the depth chart to the back up running back behind Gore. Last season's backup running back Kendall Hunter tore his ACL during training camp, Marcus Lattimore retired due to a previously suffered ACL and MCL tear in college, and James sprained his elbow. James was later released by the team. In the season opener against the Dallas Cowboys, Hyde rushed for 50 yards on seven carries and one touchdown. Over the next couple weeks, the team would not feature Hyde very much giving him a total of just seven carries. In Week 10 against the New Orleans Saints during a close game, the team turned to Frank Gore leaning on him, leaving Hyde on the bench for most of the game but Hyde showed a lot of promise rushing for 36 yards on four carries and a touchdown. After two consecutive losses, the 49ers were eliminated from playoffs so the team would look to get the young guys more reps. In Week 15 against the Seattle Seahawks, Hyde was playing well until he was benched in the fourth quarter as a result of a sprained ankle and back injury he suffered during the game. Hyde missed the final two games of the season. He finished the season with 83 carries for 333 yards and four touchdowns.

==== 2015 season ====
After the 49ers chose not to re-sign Frank Gore, Hyde entered the season as the front runner to become the feature back, but he was in competition for the starting job against Mike Davis, Reggie Bush, and former rugby league star Jarryd Hayne. He was named starter for the 2015 season. In the season opener, Hyde had the best game of his career, rushing for a career-high 168 yards on 26 carries and two touchdowns, one touchdown coming on an amazing spin move, against the Minnesota Vikings. Over the next few weeks, the team suffered two blowout losses on the road against the Pittsburgh Steelers and Arizona Cardinals and a home loss to the Green Bay Packers as a result to the team focused on the passing game to score points, abandoning the running game. In Week 5 against the New York Giants the team was more balanced, Hyde rushed for 93 yards on 21 carries and one touchdown. Despite his successful game, the 49ers lost on a last minute touchdown pass from Eli Manning to Larry Donnell with 21 seconds on the clock. More bad news came after the loss Hyde fractured his foot during the game. He played the next two games dealing with the injury but was shut down in Week 8 and did not return for the rest of the season. He needed surgery to repair the stress fracture. On December 12, Hyde was placed on injured reserve. Hyde finished with 115 carries for 470 yards and three touchdowns.

==== 2016 season ====
Hyde entered the 2016 season as one of the few bright spots on the 49ers offense. Hyde was expected to have a large volume of work as the 49ers starting running back, the team's new head coach Chip Kelly's offense relies on a good rushing attack. In the season opener, the team shutout the Los Angeles Rams in a 28–0 victory, Hyde had a great game rushing for 88 yards and two touchdowns on Monday Night Football. In Week 2, the 49ers faced the defending NFC Champion Carolina Panthers and their Top 10 defense. Hyde had a slow start to the game when he fumbled the ball and the defense returned it for a touchdown. He would then split playing time with Shaun Draughn due to his fumble. The offense could not run the ball consistently in the first half. After halftime, the Panthers offense took off and the 49ers stopped running the ball in an attempt to make a comeback. Hyde didn't get many carries after that. He finished the game with 14 carries for 34 yards. In Week 3 against the divisional rival Seahawks, Hyde had a good game although the offense had a slow start to the game including Hyde, who only rushed for 23 yards in the first half. In the second half, the passing attack was ineffective against the Seattle Seahawks "Legion of Boom", but Hyde and the rushing attack were more effective as the game got later, Hyde rushed for two eight-yard touchdowns in the fourth quarter. He finished with 21 carries for 103 yards and two touchdowns. Over the next two weeks, Hyde would keep his momentum rushing for 74 yards and one touchdown and 78 yards and one touchdown in Weeks 4 and 5 against the Cowboys and Cardinals. The next week, Hyde rushed for 52 yards on 14 carries against the Buffalo Bills. In the game, Hyde suffered a sprained right shoulder and was sidelined the next two games. In Week 11 against the New England Patriots, the team played well keeping the game close until the fourth quarter when the Patriots outscored the 49ers 17 to 7. Hyde finished the game with 19 carries for 86 yards. In Week 13 against the Chicago Bears, due to bad weather, both teams passing attack struggled and would rely on the run game, Hyde finished the game with 20 carries for 92 yards. The next week, Hyde rushed for 193 yards and one receiving touchdown in an overtime loss against the New York Jets. Hyde started 13 games in 2016 finishing the season with 217 carries for 988 yards and six touchdowns along with 27 receptions for 163 yards and three touchdowns and was named an alternate for the Pro Bowl. Unfortunately, Hyde was placed on injured reserve on December 27, 2016, after suffering an MCL injury.

==== 2017 season ====
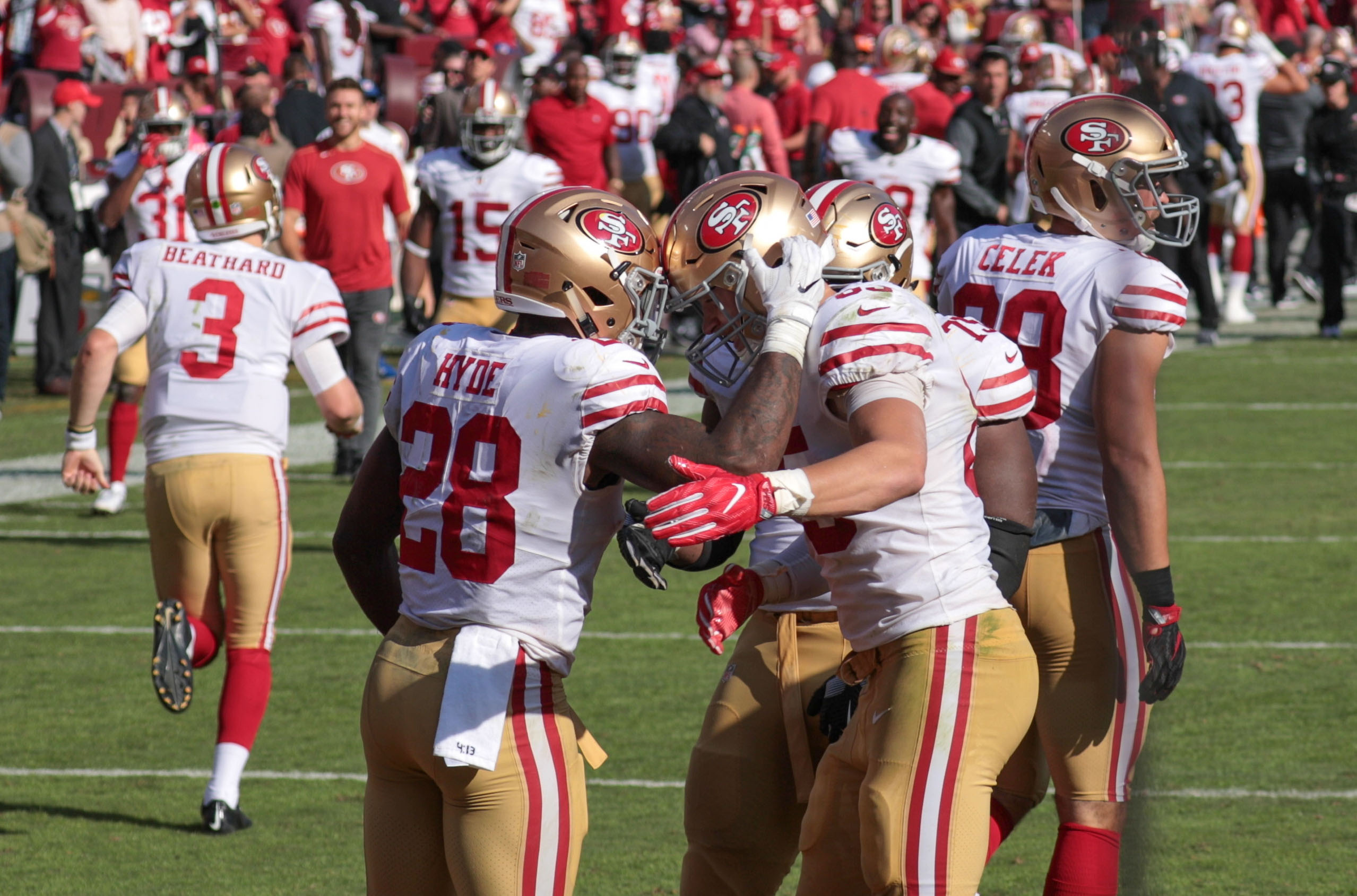
Hyde (28) with the 49ers in 2017

During the offseason, the 49ers new head coach Kyle Shanahan and general manager John Lynch brought in a lot of competition at the running back position. Hyde welcomed the challenge, saying "that just pushes me to take my game to the next level, I want to be the starter." Hyde entered in the 2017 season having lost weight; he arrived to training camp in great shape weighing 228 pounds. In an interview Hyde was quoted saying "This is the lightest I've been since high school, I'm in the best shape of my life right now." Carlos Hyde's new body transformation led to results on the field, he showed off a quicker burst on rushing attempts than ever before. Hyde averaged five yards per carry in the season opener but after the first half, the team was playing from behind so to make a comeback the offense focused heavily on the pass abandoning the rushing attack. Hyde finished the game with nine rushing attempts for 45 yards against the Panthers. In Week 2, Hyde carried the offense against the Seahawks. He rushed for 102 yards on seven carries in the first half, most of his yardage came on the longest run of his career breaking a 61-yard run. Hyde finished the game with 15 carries for 124 yards, becoming the first running back to rush for 100 yards in back to back games on the road in Seattle since Pete Carroll became the head coach in 2010. Hyde's 124 rushing yards led all rushers for Week 2. In Weeks 3–8, Hyde had two games with two rushing touchdowns. In Week 9 against the Cardinals, Hyde was involved in a fight with Frostee Rucker and Haason Reddick, with all three combatants being ejected for throwing punches in a fighting pile. On November 9, Hyde was fined $9,115 for his role in the brawl. In the last four games of the regular season, he had at least one rushing touchdown in three of the four games, with the regular-season finale having him record 88 rushing yards and two rushing touchdowns.

Playing in all 16 games in 2017, Hyde finished the season with 940 rushing yards, a career-high 350 receiving yards, and a career-high eight rushing touchdowns. He was ranked 97th by his peers on the NFL Top 100 Players of 2018.

=== Cleveland Browns ===
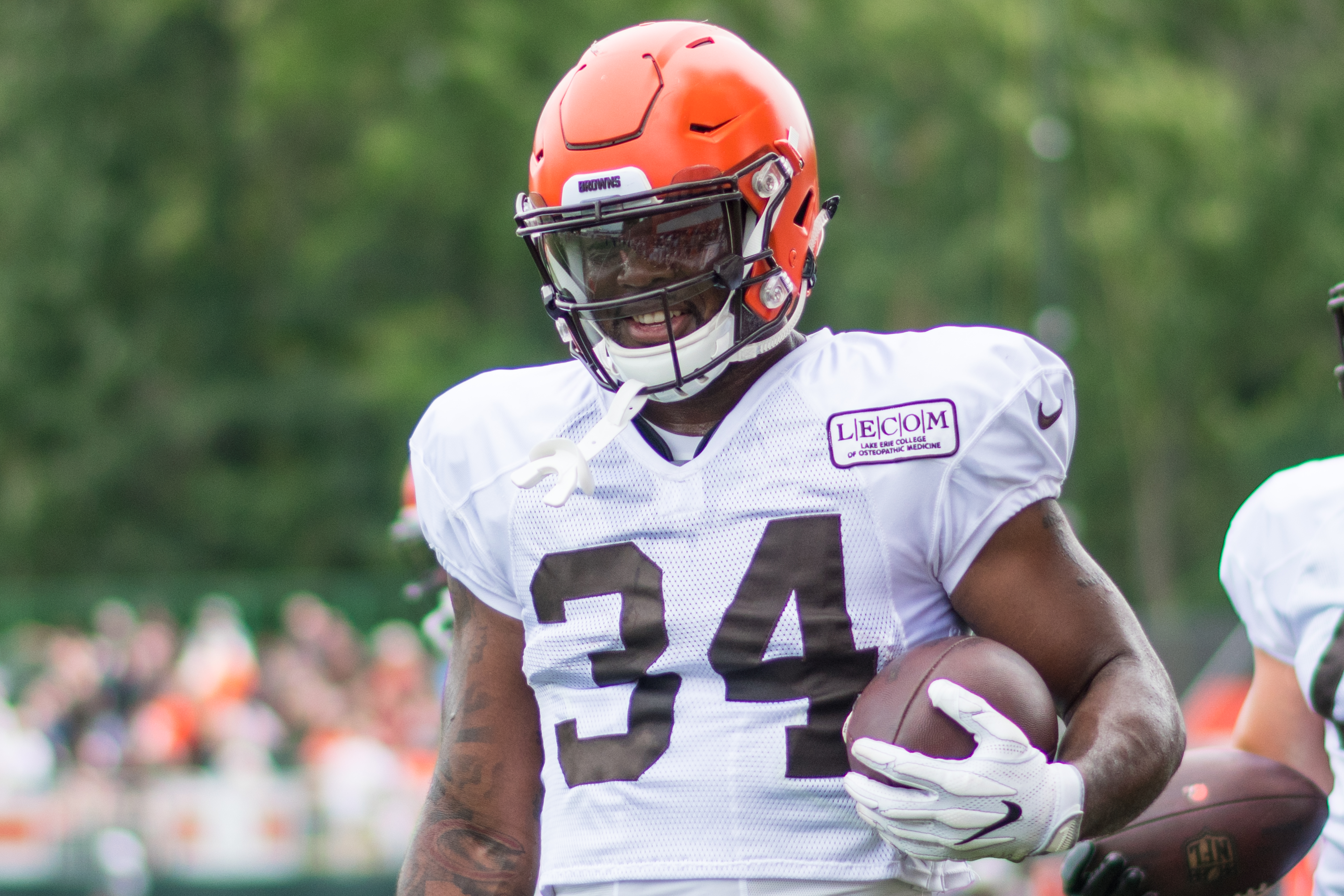
Hyde with the Cleveland Browns in 2018

On March 15, 2018, Hyde signed a three-year contract with the Cleveland Browns. Hyde made his Browns' debut in the season opener against the Steelers. In the 21–21 tie, he had 22 carries for 62 rushing yards and a rushing touchdown to help the Browns' snap their 17-game losing streak. On September 20, his 28th birthday, Hyde's girlfriend was due to give birth to his first child, and he went from the hospital to the Browns' game against the Jets. Hyde ran for 97 yards and two touchdowns, including the game-winning score that gave the Browns a 21–17 win, their first in 19 games. Hyde then returned to the hospital, where his girlfriend gave birth to their son.

=== Jacksonville Jaguars (first stint) ===
On October 19, 2018, the Browns traded Hyde to the Jacksonville Jaguars for a fifth round pick in the 2019 NFL draft. Hyde shared the backfield with Leonard Fournette and T. J. Yeldon for the remainder of the 2018 season. Overall, Hyde finished the 2018 season with 571 rushing yards and five rushing touchdowns.

On March 8, 2019, Hyde was released by the Jaguars.

=== Kansas City Chiefs ===
On March 9, 2019, Hyde signed a one-year, $2.8 million deal with the Kansas City Chiefs.

=== Houston Texans ===
On August 31, 2019, Hyde was traded to the Houston Texans in exchange for tackle Martinas Rankin. Hyde made his debut with the Texans in Week 1 against the Saints. In the game, Hyde rushed 10 times for 83 yards and caught one pass for two yards in the 30–28 loss. In Week 6 against the Kansas City Chiefs, Hyde rushed 26 times for 116 yards and 1 touchdown in the 31–24 win. During Week 9 against the Jaguars at Wembley Stadium, Hyde finished with 160 rushing yards, including a 58-yard run that resulted in a fumble lost in the endzone for a touchback. Nevertheless, the Texans won 26–3. In Week 15 against the Tennessee Titans, Hyde rushed 26 times for 104 yards and a touchdown during the 24–21 win. Overall, in the 2019 season, Hyde finished with 1,070 rushing yards and six rushing touchdowns.

In the Wild Card Round, Hyde played in his first NFL playoff game against the Bills. He rushed 16 times for 48 yards and had a five-yard touchdown reception to help the Texans win 22–19 in overtime.

=== Seattle Seahawks ===
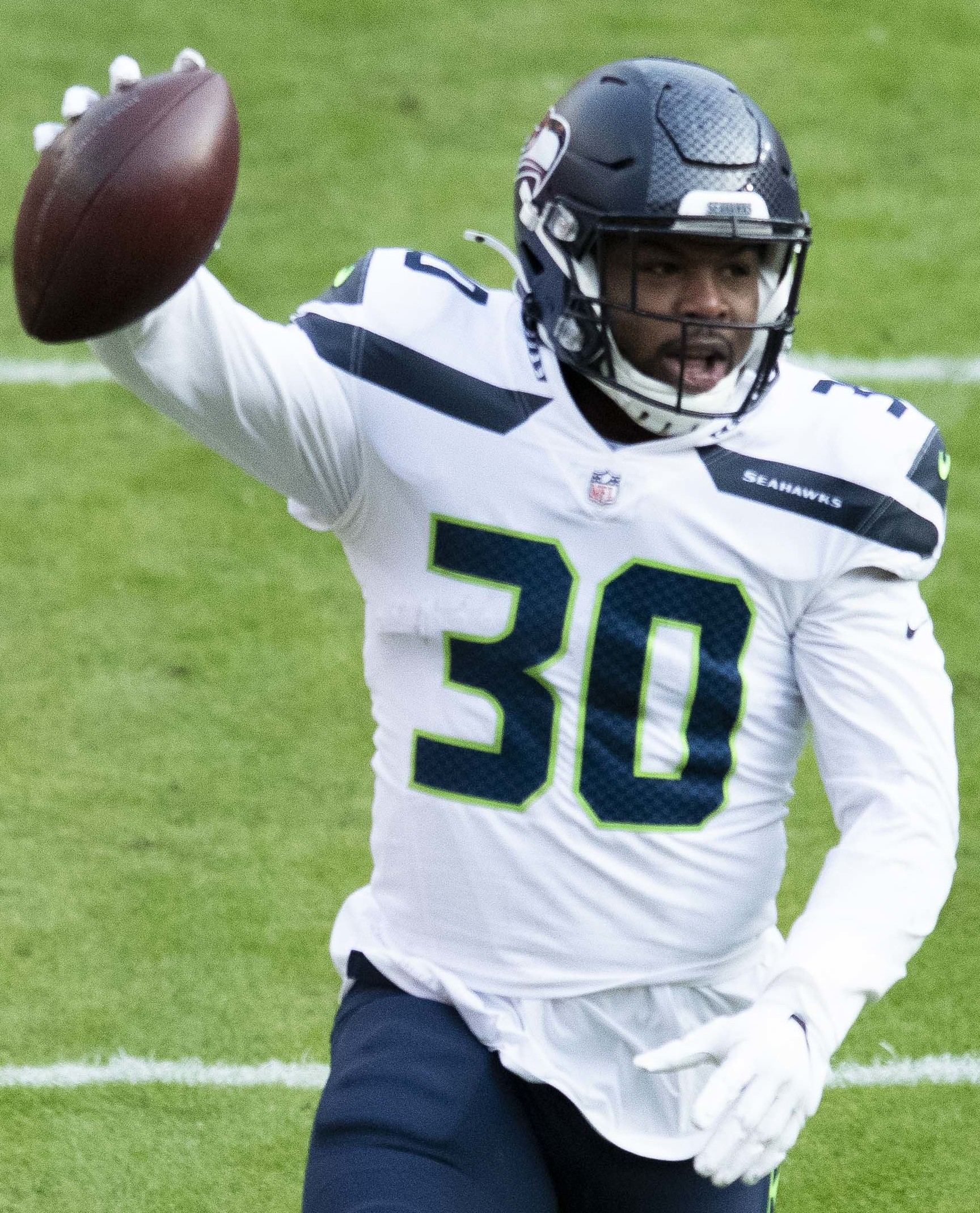
Hyde with the Seattle Seahawks in 2020

On May 28, 2020, Hyde signed with the Seahawks. Hyde played his first game with the Seahawks in Week 1 against the Atlanta Falcons. During the game, Hyde rushed for his first rushing touchdown of the season and as a member of the Seahawks. He finished the 2020 season with 81 carries for 356 yards and four touchdowns.

=== Jacksonville Jaguars (second stint) ===
On March 17, 2021, Hyde signed a two-year, $6 million contract with the Jaguars and reunited with his former college coach, Urban Meyer. He entered the 2021 season as the backup running back to James Robinson. He suffered a concussion in Week 14 and was placed on injured reserve on December 21. He finished the season with 72 carries for 253 rushing yards and one touchdown through 12 games and two starts.

On March 11, 2022, Hyde was released by the Jaguars.

== Career statistics ==
=== NFL ===
==== Regular season ====
Year	Team	Games		Rushing					Receiving					Fumbles	
Year	Team	GP	GS	Att	Yds	Avg	Lng	TD	Rec	Yds	Avg	Lng	TD	Fum	Lost
2014	SF	14	0	83	333	4.0	28	4	12	68	5.7	16	0	1	1
2015	SF	7	7	115	470	4.1	22	3	11	53	4.8	11	0	1	0
2016	SF	13	13	217	988	4.6	47	6	23	167	6.0	19	3	5	3
2017	SF	16	16	240	940	3.9	61	8	59	350	5.9	18	0	2	0
2018	CLE	6	6	114	382	3.4	22	5	6	29	4.8	9	0	1	0
2018	JAX	8	2	58	189	3.3	19	0	4	4	1.0	6	0	1	1
2019	HOU	16	14	245	1,070	4.4	58	6	10	42	4.2	14	0	4	2
2020	SEA	10	1	81	356	4.4	50	4	16	93	5.8	18	0	1	0
2021	JAX	12	2	72	253	3.5	18	1	12	65	5.4	9	0	2	2
Career		102	60	1,225	4,979	4.1	61	37	157	867	5.5	19	3	18	9

==== Postseason ====
Year	Team	Games		Rushing					Receiving					Fumbles	
Year	Team	GP	GS	Att	Yds	Avg	Lng	TD	Rec	Yds	Avg	Lng	TD	Fum	Lost
2019	HOU	2	1	29	92	3.2	8	0	4	23	5.8	10	1	0	0
2020	SEA	1	0	4	5	1.3	3	0	0	0	0.0	0	0	0	0
Career		3	1	33	97	2.9	8	0	4	23	5.8	10	1	0	0

=== College ===
Year	Team	Games		Rushing				Receiving			
Year	Team	GP	GS	Att	Yds	Avg	TD	Rec	Yds	Avg	TD
2010	Ohio State	7	0	24	141	5.9	0	0	0	0.0	0
2011	Ohio State	13	3	106	566	5.3	6	10	73	7.3	0
2012	Ohio State	10	10	185	970	5.2	16	8	51	6.4	1
2013	Ohio State	11	10	208	1,521	7.3	15	16	147	9.2	3
Career		41	23	523	3,198	6.1	37	34	271	8.0	4
