= Donald Frank =

American football player (born 1965)

No. 27, 47, 37
- Position: Cornerback

Personal information
- Born: October 24, 1965 (age 61); Edgecombe County; North Carolina, U.S.
- Listed height: 6 ft 0 in (1.83 m)
- Listed weight: 192 lb (87 kg)

Career information
- High school: Tarboro (NC)
- College: Winston-Salem State
- NFL draft: 1990: undrafted

Career history
- San Diego Chargers (1990–1993); Cleveland Browns (1994)*; Los Angeles Raiders (1994); Minnesota Vikings (1995)
- * Offseason or practice squad member only
- Stats at Pro Football Reference

Donald Lee Frank (born October 24, 1965) is an American former professional football player who was a defensive back in the National Football League (NFL).

Frank was born in Edgecombe County, North Carolina. He played scholastically at Tarboro High School and collegiately at Winston-Salem State University.

Frank spent six seasons in the NFL with the San Diego Chargers, Los Angeles Raiders, and Minnesota Vikings.
