= Shaun Draughn =

American football player (born 1987)

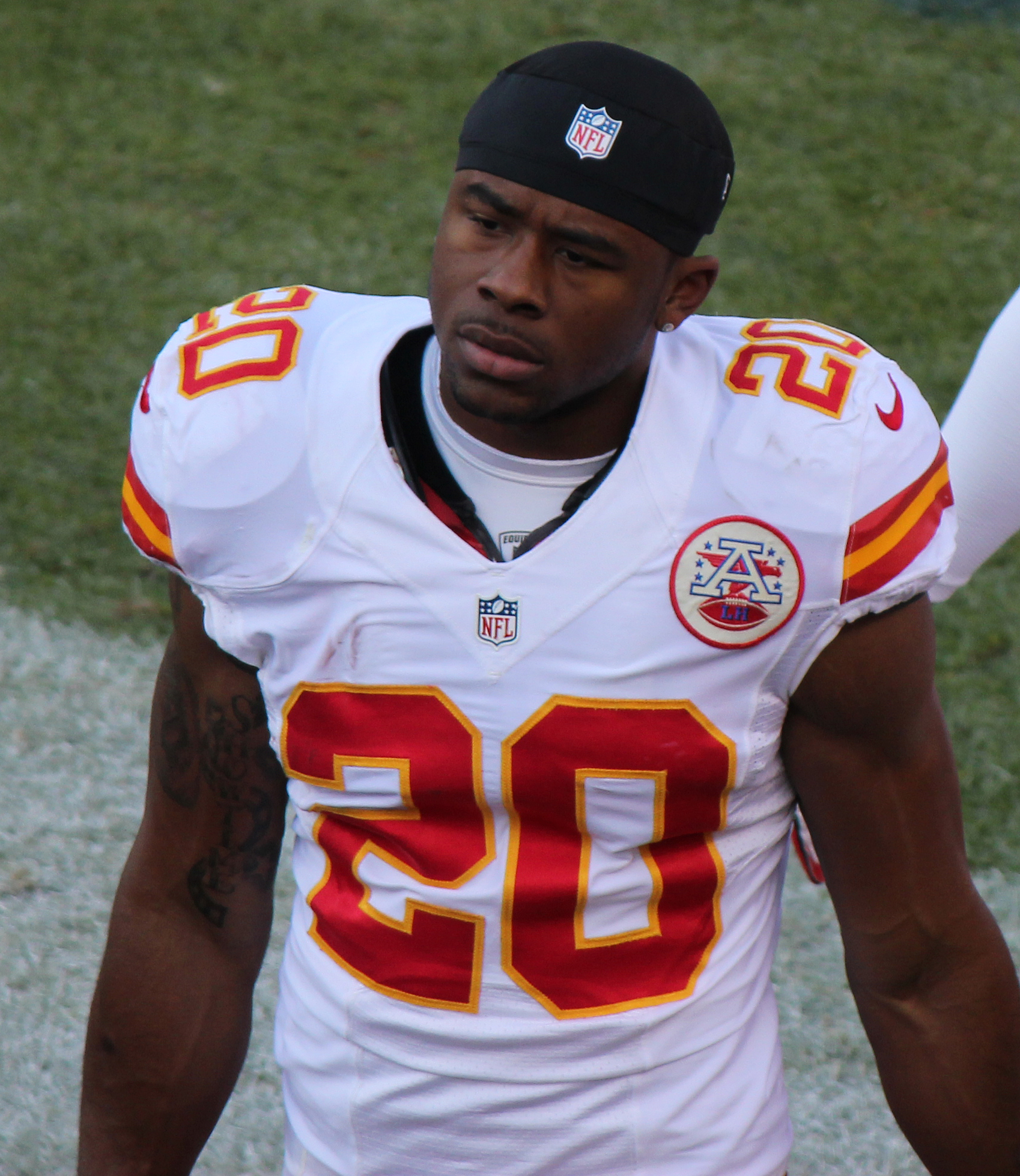
- Draughn with the Kansas City Chiefs in 2012

No. 32, 20, 38, 28, 24
- Position: Running back

Personal information
- Born: December 7, 1987 (age 38); Tarboro, North Carolina, U.S.
- Listed height: 5 ft 11 in (1.80 m)
- Listed weight: 205 lb (93 kg)

Career information
- High school: Tarboro
- College: North Carolina
- NFL draft: 2011: undrafted

Career history
- Washington Redskins (2011)*; Kansas City Chiefs (2011–2012); Baltimore Ravens (2013); Indianapolis Colts (2013); Chicago Bears (2014); San Diego Chargers (2014); Cleveland Browns (2014–2015); San Francisco 49ers (2015–2016); New York Giants (2017)*
- * Offseason or practice squad member only

Career NFL statistics
- Rushing yards: 723
- Rushing average: 3.2
- Rushing touchdowns: 7
- Receptions: 80
- Receiving yards: 597
- Receiving touchdowns: 2
- Stats at Pro Football Reference

Kenneth Shaun Draughn (/ˈdroʊn/ "drone"; born December 7, 1987) is an American former professional football player who was a running back in the National Football League (NFL). He played college football for the North Carolina Tar Heels and signed with the Washington Redskins as an undrafted free agent in 2011. Draughn was also a member of eight other NFL teams.

== Early life ==
Draughn was born on December 7, 1987, in Tarboro, North Carolina, to ministers Shirley and Kenneth Draughn. He attended Tarboro High School, where he won three varsity letters in football as a quarterback, defensive back, linebacker, and running back. As a junior, Draughn recorded 952 yards and 18 touchdowns. As a senior, he recorded 253 rushing attempts for 1,452 yards, and 21 touchdowns. Draughn received all-league honors and was named the Red Zone Player of the Week thrice and the Eastern Plains Offensive Player of the Year. The Daily Sentinel and The Daily Southerner named him the player of the year, and the Rocky Mount Telegram named him the offensive player of the year. Rivals.com named Draughn the 10th-ranked, SuperPrep named him the 12th-ranked, and The Charlotte Observer named him the 18th-ranked player in the state of North Carolina.

== College career ==
At the University of North Carolina at Chapel Hill, Draughn sat out the 2006 season on redshirt status.

Draughn participated as a member of the defensive scout team. In 2007, he played in 11 games, mostly on special teams. Draughn saw action as a safety against James Madison and Virginia. He recorded five tackles, including two solo.

In 2008, Draughn saw action in all 13 games as a tailback and recorded 198 carries for 866 yards and three touchdowns to go along with 16 receptions for 81 yards and one touchdown.

== Professional career ==
=== Washington Redskins ===
Draughn signed with the Washington Redskins as an undrafted free agent on July 28, 2011, following the 2011 NFL draft. He was cut on September 3 for final roster cuts before the beginning of the 2011 season.

=== Kansas City Chiefs ===
On October 5, 2011, Draughn was signed to the practice squad of the Kansas City Chiefs. After being on the practice squad for 13 weeks, he was promoted to the active 53-man roster and was placed third on the running back depth chart on December 31, 2011, after Jackie Battle was placed on the injured reserve due to a foot injury sustained in the Chiefs' Christmas Day loss to the Oakland Raiders. Draughn played against the Denver Broncos in the season finale as a special teamer.

Before the 2012 season started, Draughn was listed as the third-string running back. During the final seconds of the season opener against the Atlanta Falcons, Draughn scored his first career touchdown as the Chiefs lost 24–40. He scored another touchdown on a six-yard carry during the Week 9 game against the San Diego Chargers. Draughn finished the 2012 season with 59 carries for 233 yards and two touchdowns.

=== Baltimore Ravens ===
While Draughn was again listed as the third of four running backs on the Chiefs' depth chart, he was released before 53-man roster cuts in August. Draughn was then signed by the Baltimore Ravens on September 11, 2013. He saw limited action with the Ravens appearing in only three games. On October 10, 2013, Draughn was released. In the three games he was active, Draughn recorded only 2 yards from 4 attempts.

=== Indianapolis Colts ===
On December 17, 2013, the Indianapolis Colts announced they had placed linebacker Pat Angerer on season-ending injured reserve and had signed Draughn. Four days later, Draughn was waived by the Colts.

=== Chicago Bears ===
Draughn signed a one-year deal with the Chicago Bears on April 23, 2014.

=== San Diego Chargers ===
On September 23, 2014, Draughn signed a one-year deal with the San Diego Chargers. He was released on November 1.

=== Cleveland Browns ===
On December 3, 2014, Draughn signed with the Cleveland Browns. On March 6, 2015, the Browns re-signed him to another contract. On September 5, Draughn was waived by the Browns. The next day, he cleared waivers and was signed to the Browns' practice squad. On September 12, Draughn was promoted to the active roster. He only played five games with the Browns, recording two carries for 10 yards.

=== San Francisco 49ers ===
On November 2, 2015, Draughn signed with the San Francisco 49ers due to an injury to starter, Carlos Hyde. Draughn was placed on injured reserve on December 30, 2015.

Draughn was re-signed to a one-year deal on March 2, 2016. In Week 1 against the Los Angeles Rams, he stiff armed his way into the end zone. On October 23, against the Tampa Bay Buccaneers, he scored a long touchdown catch. On November 20, 2016, he scored a receiving touchdown against the New England Patriots. In the 2016 season, Draughn had 196 rushing yards and four touchdowns to go along with 263 receiving yards and two touchdowns.

=== New York Giants ===
On March 21, 2017, Draughn signed a one-year contract with the New York Giants. He was released on September 2, 2017.

=== Retirement ===
Draughn announced his retirement on November 24, 2018.
