= Fahn Cooper =

American football player (born 1993)

No. 64
- Position: Offensive tackle

Personal information
- Born: April 30, 1993 (age 33); Crystal Lake, Illinois, U.S.
- Listed height: 6 ft 5 in (1.96 m)
- Listed weight: 306 lb (139 kg)

Career information
- High school: Crystal Lake South
- College: Ole Miss
- NFL draft: 2016: 5th round, 174th overall pick

Career history
- San Francisco 49ers (2016)*; Indianapolis Colts (2017)*
- * Offseason or practice squad member only

Awards and highlights
- Kent Hull Trophy (2015)
- Stats at Pro Football Reference

Fahn Cooper (born April 30, 1993) is an American former football offensive tackle. He played college football at Ole Miss and was drafted by the San Francisco 49ers in the fifth round of the 2016 NFL draft.

== College career ==
=== Bowling Green University ===
Cooper began attending Bowling Green University in 2011 and sat out his first year as a redshirt. He played in all 13 regular season games for the Falcon's and started at left tackle.

=== College of DuPage ===
Seeking an opportunity, Cooper transferred out of Bowling Green to College of DuPage in 2013. He started all 13 games for head coach Matt Foster and was rated by ESPN.com as the #5 junior college offensive tackle in the nation and the #18 overall junior college prospect in the nation. 247sports.com and ESPN.com also had him rated as a four-star prospect.

=== University of Mississippi ===
As a highly touted junior college prospect, Cooper chose to attend the University of Mississippi and play under head coach Hugh Freeze. He was the Rebels' starting right tackle going into the season and was able to start all 13 regular-season games, including two at left tackle. He made his debut on August 28, 2014, helping Ole Miss secure a 35–13 victory over Boise State.

On November 1, 2014, he started at left tackle for the first time during his career at Ole Miss after starting left tackle Laremy Tunsil was unable to play due to injury. The Rebels went on to lose 35–31 to #3 Auburn. He also started at left tackle the following week during a 48-0 victory over Presbyterian College.

Cooper chose to forgo the 2015 NFL draft and return to Ole Miss for his senior season. He began the season as the starting left tackle after Tunsil was suspended 7 games for receiving improper benefits. He started the season opener against UT Martin and helped the Rebels win 73–3 making it the most points they've scored since 1935. They also had 662 yards of offense, making it the second most for a single game in school history. On September 19, 2015, he helped Mississippi defeat #2 Alabama 43–37, making the most points Ole Miss has ever scored at Alabama. The following week, he earned Southeastern Conference (SEC) offensive lineman of the week after helping Ole Miss defeat Vanderbilt 27–16. Cooper was mid-season all-SEC by ESPN.com and won the Kent Hull Trophy as Mississippi's top collegiate offensive lineman. He started every regular season contest for the Rebels, 7 of them being at left tackle and 6 at right tackle after the return of Tunsil.

== Professional career ==
=== Pre-draft ===
Cooper decided to declare himself eligible for the 2016 NFL draft after having no eligibility remaining after his 2015 season at Ole Miss. He was projected to be a sixth or seventh round selection after performing well at the 2016 NFL Combine in Indianapolis. He performed at Ole Miss' Pro Day and improved on his combine stats. He was able to bench press 225 lbs 24 times and had a 9-foot 8 inch broad jump, a foot and two inches better than at the combine. He also performed well during his positional drills but was overshadowed by outstanding performances by teammates and projected first rounders Robert Nkemdiche, Laremy Tunsil, and Laquon Treadwell.

Pre-draft measurables
Height	Weight	Arm length	Hand span	40-yard dash	10-yard split	20-yard split	20-yard shuttle	Three-cone drill	Vertical jump	Broad jump	Bench press
6 ft 4 1/2 in (1.94 m)	303 lb (137 kg)	34 3/4 in (0.88 m)	10 in (0.25 m)	5.17 s	1.81 s	2.99 s	4.89 s	7.85 s	25.0 in (0.64 m)	9 ft 8 in (2.95 m)	24 reps
All values from NFL Combine/Pro Day

=== San Francisco 49ers ===
The San Francisco 49ers selected Cooper in the fifth round (174th overall) in the 2016 NFL draft.

On May 6, 2016, the 49ers signed him to a four-year, $2.52 million rookie contract with a signing bonus of $184,384.

Going into training camp, Cooper was expected to compete for the 49ers' starting right guard position along with Ian Silberman and fellow rookies Joshua Garnett and John Theus. First rounder Garnett ultimately won the starting right guard position with Theus winning the backup left tackle position. He was released as part of the 49ers' final roster cuts but was added to their practice squad after going unclaimed. He spent his entire rookie year on the practice squad although on November 15, 2016, he was added to the practice squad's injured list due to "a medical issue that is non-mechanical in nature."

=== Indianapolis Colts ===
On February 27, 2017, Cooper signed with the Indianapolis Colts. On September 2, 2017, Cooper was waived by the Colts.
