= Norman Price (American football) =

American gridiron football player (born 1994)

No. 66, 63, 78
- Position: Offensive guard

Personal information
- Born: August 25, 1994 (age 32); Vicksburg, Mississippi, U.S.
- Listed height: 6 ft 4 in (1.93 m)
- Listed weight: 311 lb (141 kg)

Career information
- High school: Vicksburg (Vicksburg, Mississippi)
- College: Southern Mississippi
- NFL draft: 2016: undrafted

Career history
- San Francisco 49ers (2016–2017)*; Jacksonville Jaguars (2017)*; Carolina Panthers (2018)*; Calgary Stampeders (2019)*; Carolina Panthers (2019)*; Toronto Argonauts (2020–2021)*; San Antonio Brahmas (2023); Houston Roughnecks (2024)*
- * Offseason or practice squad member only
- Stats at Pro Football Reference

Norman Henry Price II (born August 25, 1994) is a former gridiron football offensive guard. He played college football at Southern Mississippi.

== Early life ==
Price was born to Charlotte and Norman Price. Price graduated from Vicksburg High School where he played football and basketball.

== College career ==
Price started his college career at Hinds Community College. Price helped Hinds record 1,428 yards passing and 2,178 yards rushing for 3,606 total yards in 9 games as Freshman in 2012. In 2013, he helped Hinds to a 7-3 record and a berth in the Brazos Valley Bowl. Hinds totaled 421.6 yards per game average which was good for No. 16 nationally in the NJCAA, while the Eagles also finished No. 11 in the nation in rushing yards with 2,337. Price earned All-State honors and First-team All-Region 23. In 2014, his first year with Southern Miss, Price played in nine games on the season, making six starts. He made his NCAA Division I debut with first Division I start in the season opener on the road at Mississippi State. Earned a start against Appalachian State. Helped the team rush for 1,149 yards, while passing for an additional 3,231 for a total offensive production of 4,380. Price majored in communications.

== Professional career ==
Pre-draft measurables
Height	Weight	40-yard dash	10-yard split	20-yard split	20-yard shuttle	Three-cone drill	Vertical jump	Broad jump	Bench press
6 ft 4 in (1.93 m)	309 lb (140 kg)	5.11 s	1.86 s	2.96 s	4.72 s	7.76 s	28.5 in (0.72 m)	8 ft 4 in (2.54 m)	31 reps
All values from Southern Miss's Pro Day

=== San Francisco 49ers ===
On May 6, 2016, the San Francisco 49ers signed Price as an undrafted free agent. He was waived on September 3, 2016 and was signed to the practice squad the next day. After spending his entire rookie season on the practice squad, Price signed a reserve/future contract with the 49ers on January 3, 2017.

On September 1, 2017, Price was waived by the 49ers.

=== Jacksonville Jaguars ===
On October 13, 2017, Price was signed to the Jacksonville Jaguars' practice squad. He was released on October 24, 2017.

=== First stint with Panthers ===
On June 4, 2018, Price signed with the Carolina Panthers. He was waived on August 31, 2018.

=== Calgary Stampeders ===
Price signed with the Calgary Stampeders of the Canadian Football League on March 18, 2019. He was released on April 18.

=== Second stint with Panthers ===
Price re-signed with the Carolina Panthers on July 24, 2019. He was placed on injured reserve on August 19, 2019. He was released on August 28, 2019.

=== Toronto Argonauts ===
Price signed with the Toronto Argonauts of the CFL on March 2, 2020. He signed a contract extension with the team on December 18, 2020. He was released on May 18, 2021.

=== San Antonio Brahmas ===
On November 17, 2022, Price was drafted by the San Antonio Brahmas of the XFL. He was placed on the team's reserve list on April 19, 2023.

=== Houston Roughnecks ===
On January 15, 2024, Price was selected by the Houston Roughnecks in the fourth round of the Super Draft portion of the 2024 UFL dispersal draft. He retired on February 27, 2024.
