= Takoby Cofield =

American gridiron football player (born 1992)

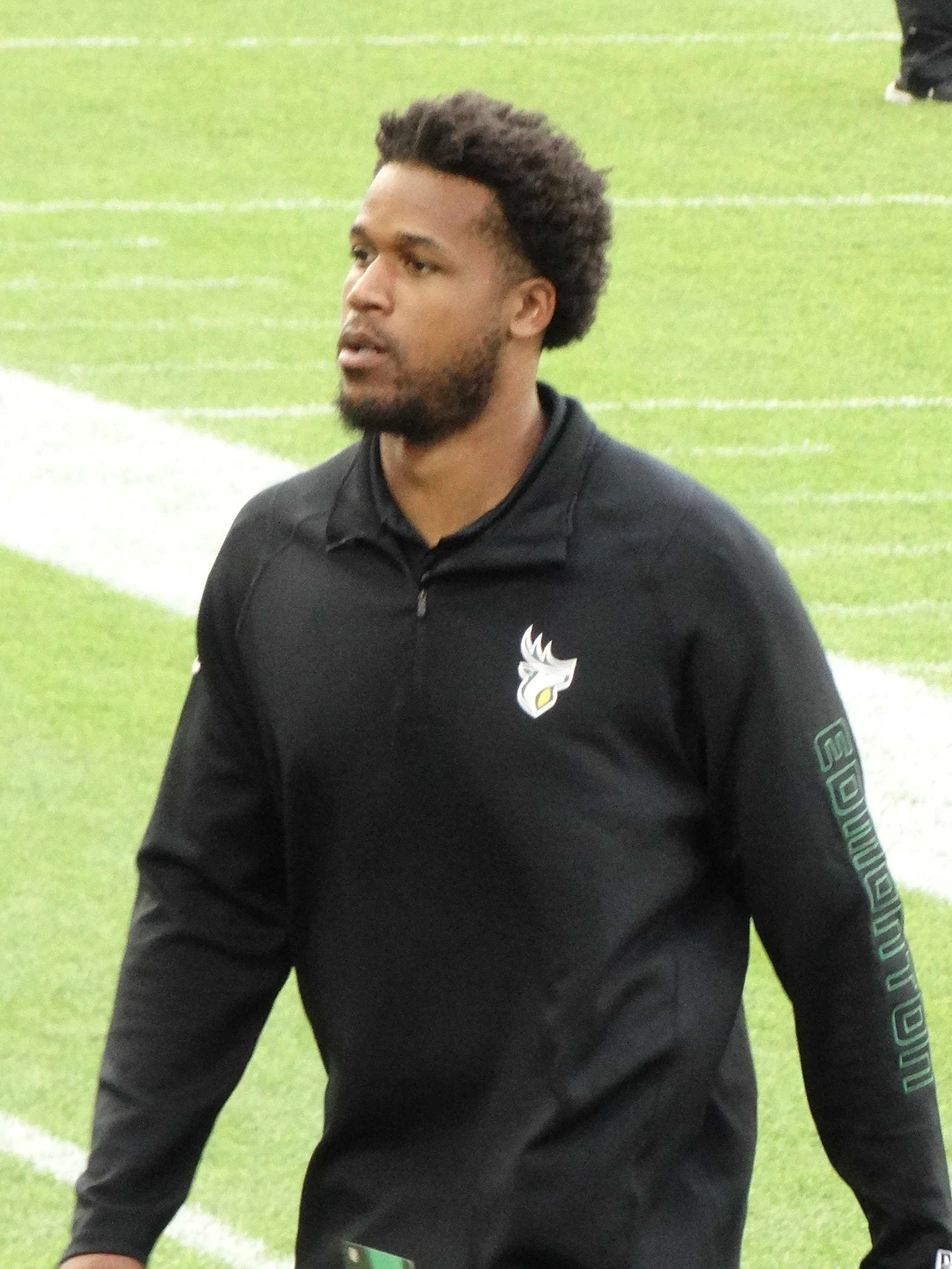
- Cofield with the Edmonton Elks in 2024

Edmonton Elks
- Title: Assistant offensive line coach
- CFL status: American

Personal information
- Born: January 22, 1992 (age 34); Tarboro, North Carolina, U.S.
- Listed height: 6 ft 4 in (1.93 m)
- Listed weight: 310 lb (141 kg)

Career information
- High school: Tarboro (Tarboro, North Carolina)
- College: Duke (2010–2014)
- NFL draft: 2015: undrafted

Career history

Playing
- Washington Redskins (2015–2016)*; Seattle Seahawks (2016)*; Oakland Raiders (2016)*; Saskatchewan Roughriders (2018–2021)
- * Offseason or practice squad member only

Coaching
- East Carolina (2021) (Defensive graduate assistant); East Carolina (2022) (Offensive assistant); Bluefield State (2023) (Offensive line coach); Edmonton Elks (2024–present) (Assistant offensive line coach)

Career CFL statistics
- Games played: 15
- Games started: 15
- Stats at CFL.ca

Takoby Cofield (born January 22, 1992) is an American assistant offensive line coach for the Edmonton Elks of the Canadian Football League (CFL) and a former professional football left tackle. He played college football at Duke and was originally signed as an undrafted free agent by the Washington Redskins. He played two seasons with the Saskatchewan Roughriders.

== Early life and education ==
Takoby Cofield was born on January 22, 1992, in Tarboro, North Carolina. He went to Tarboro High School in North Carolina. He played college football at Duke. While at Duke, he played 42 consecutive games, playing in 3,274 snaps. In his senior season, he was named All-Atlantic Coast Conference. The 310 pound offensive lineman was nicknamed "Big Cat" by his coach.

== Professional career ==
Cofield went undrafted in the 2015 NFL draft. He signed with the Washington Redskins as an undrafted free agent after the Draft. He did not make the roster but later signed to the practice squad. The next year he did not make the roster and was not signed to the practice squad. Instead, he signed with the Seattle Seahawks. In 2017, he signed with the Oakland Raiders but did not play. In 2018, he signed with the Saskatchewan Roughriders of the Canadian Football League. He played in and started 11 games in his first season in the CFL. He played four games the next season before being sidelined with an injury. He signed a contract extension in 2020. He was placed on the suspended list by the Roughriders on July 3, 2021.

Cofield announced his retirement in the 2021 off-season.

== Coaching career ==
On March 18, 2024, it was announced that Cofield had been hired by the Edmonton Elks to serve as the team's assistant offensive line coach.
