= John Theus =

American football player (born 1994)

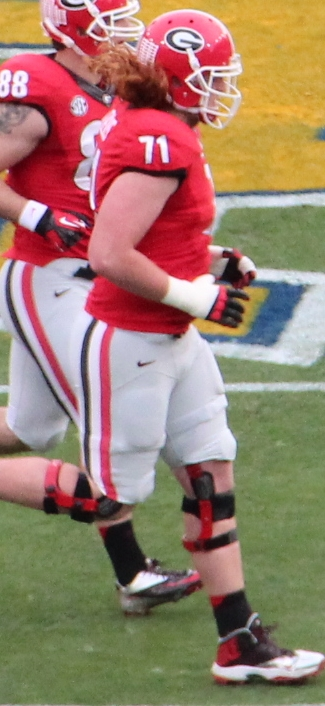
- Theus with the Georgia Bulldogs in 2013

No. 71
- Position: Offensive tackle

Personal information
- Born: January 19, 1994 (age 32); Jacksonville, Florida, U.S.
- Listed height: 6 ft 6 in (1.98 m)
- Listed weight: 303 lb (137 kg)

Career information
- High school: Bolles School (Jacksonville)
- College: Georgia
- NFL draft: 2016: 5th round, 145th overall pick

Career history
- San Francisco 49ers (2016–2017); Carolina Panthers (2017); New Orleans Saints (2018)*; Tennessee Titans (2018)*
- * Offseason or practice squad member only

Awards and highlights
- First-team All-SEC (2015)

Career NFL statistics
- Games played: 4
- Games started: 1
- Stats at Pro Football Reference

John Bailey Theus (born January 19, 1994) is an American former professional football player who was an offensive tackle in the National Football League (NFL). He played college football for the Georgia Bulldogs.

== Early life ==
A native of Jacksonville, Florida, Theus attended Bolles School where he was coached by Corky Rogers. As a sophomore, he was part of a 12–1 Bolles Bulldogs team led by running back Jawan Jamison that defeated Tampa Catholic for the 2009 FHSAA Class 4A state title. In his junior season, Bolles went undefeated through the regular season, only to lose 35–21 to Ocala Trinity Catholic in the Region 1-2B championship. In Theus' senior season, Bolles went 16–1 and beat Miami Washington for the second Class 4A state title in three years. After the season, Theus played in the U.S. Army All-American Bowl and was also named All-American by Parade and USA Today.

Regarded as a consensus five-star recruit, Theus was ranked as one of the best offensive tackle prospects of the class of 2012, which also included Zach Banner, D. J. Humphries, and Andrus Peat. With scholarship offers from almost every major program in the country, Theus chose Georgia over Notre Dame, Florida, Texas, and Alabama.

== College career ==
In his true freshman season at the University of Georgia, Theus started all 14 games at right tackle. He was only the third true freshman to start at offensive tackle in a season opener for Georgia since freshmen became eligible in 1973, and the first since Trinton Sturdivant in 2007. After a solid season in which Georgia ranked No. 1 in the Southeastern Conference (SEC) in yards per play, Theus was named Freshman All-American by CBSSports.com, The Sporting News, and Phil Steele. As a sophomore, Theus lost his starting job for stints when Kolton Houston returned to the team after having his eligibility cleared by the NCAA. Theus played in all 13 games of the season, starting eight of them.

For his junior season, Theus was moved over to left tackle where he started in all 13 games. He was part of an offensive line that helped Georgia rush for 257.8 yards per game, which ranked first in the SEC. Theus earned Associated Press Honorable Mention All-SEC after the season. For his senior season Theus started all 13 games, 9 at left tackle, 4 at right tackle. Theus was named All SEC 1st team. Theus finished his career being named all around team captain.

== Professional career ==
=== Pre-draft ===
Coming out of college, Theus was projected to be a fourth to sixth round selection. He was ranked the 14th best offensive tackle out of the 109 available by NFLDraftScout.com. He was invited to the NFL Combine and was able to complete all their drills and workouts besides the bench press. He participated at Georgia's Pro Day and was satisfied with his combine number, only performing positional drills and the bench.

Pre-draft measurables
Height	Weight	Arm length	Hand span	40-yard dash	10-yard split	20-yard split	20-yard shuttle	Three-cone drill	Vertical jump	Broad jump	Bench press
6 ft 6 in (1.98 m)	313 lb (142 kg)	34 1/2 in (0.88 m)	10 in (0.25 m)	5.22 s	1.80 s	3.00 s	4.78 s	7.90 s	28 in (0.71 m)	8 ft 7 in (2.62 m)	19 reps
All values from NFL Combine

=== San Francisco 49ers ===
The San Francisco 49ers selected Theus in the fifth round, (145th overall) of the 2016 NFL draft. On May 5, 2016, the 49ers signed him to a four-year, $2.59 million rookie contract with a signing bonus of $257,612.

On September 13, 2017, Theus was waived by the 49ers.

=== Carolina Panthers ===
On September 14, 2017, Theus was claimed off waivers by the Carolina Panthers. He was placed on injured reserve on December 2, 2017.

On February 26, 2018, Theus was waived by the Panthers.

=== New Orleans Saints ===
On February 27, 2018, Theus was claimed off waivers by the New Orleans Saints. He was waived/injured by the Saints on May 7, 2018 and was placed on injured reserve. He was released on May 16, 2018.

=== Tennessee Titans ===
On May 17, 2018, Theus was claimed off waivers by the Tennessee Titans.

On August 1, 2018, Theus announced his retirement from the NFL.
