= 2018 Cleveland Browns season =

70th season in franchise history

- Owner: Jimmy Haslam
- General manager: John Dorsey
- Head coach: Hue Jackson (fired October 29, 2–5–1 record); Gregg Williams (interim, 5–3 record)
- Home stadium: FirstEnergy Stadium

Results
- Record: 7–8–1
- Division place: 3rd AFC North
- Playoffs: Did not qualify
- All-Pros: OG Joel Bitonio (2nd team); DE Myles Garrett (2nd team)
- Pro Bowlers: OG Joel Bitonio; DE Myles Garrett; WR Jarvis Landry; CB Denzel Ward

Uniform
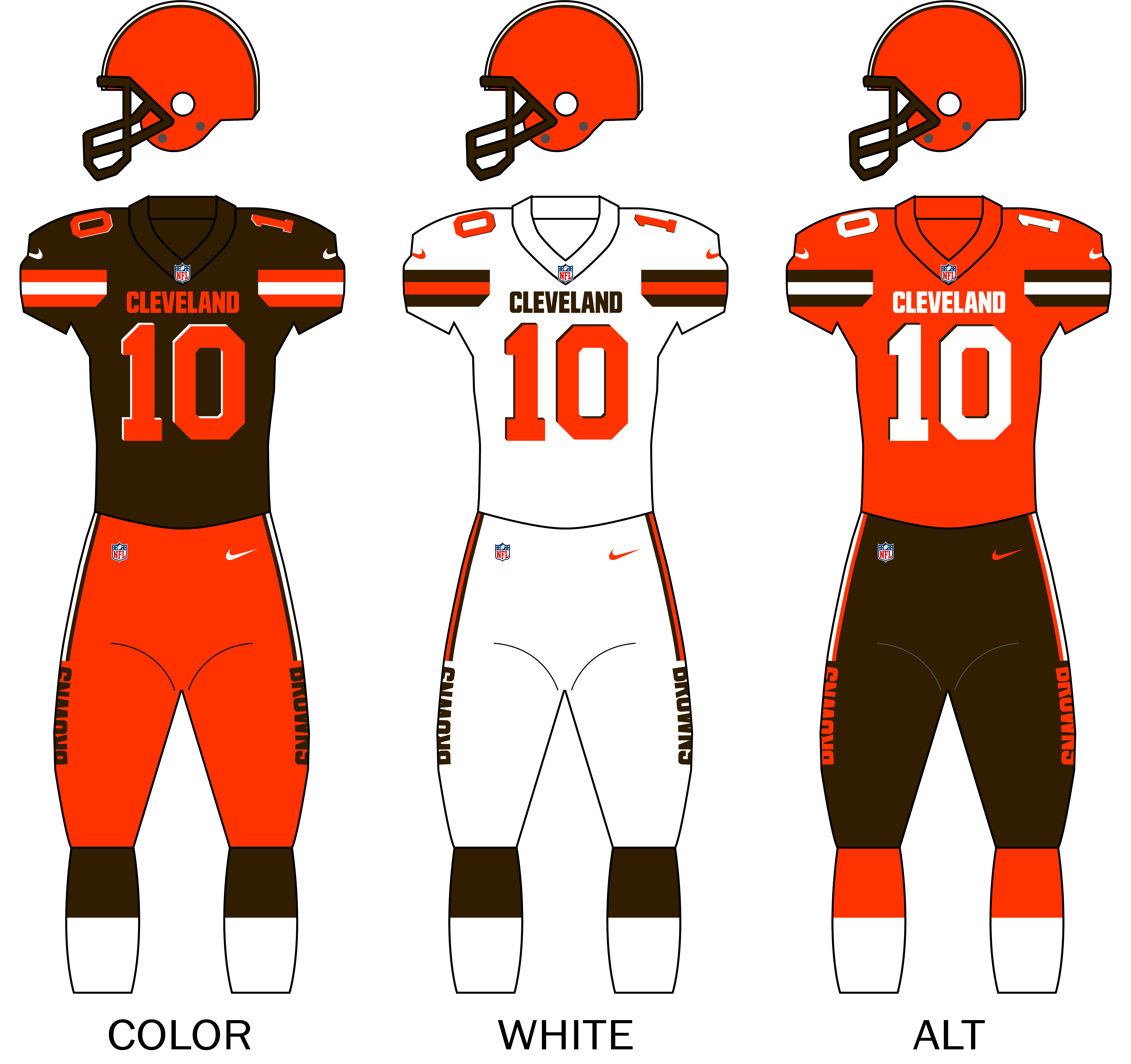

The 2018 season was the Cleveland Browns' 66th season in the National Football League (NFL), their 70th overall, their first full season under general manager John Dorsey, and their third and final season under head coach Hue Jackson. This for the first time since 2006 that Joe Thomas was not on the opening day roster. Unusually, the Browns started their campaign with a tie, although this result was enough to ensure they would improve upon the 2017 campaign in which they finished 0–16. Cleveland ultimately finished in 3rd place in the AFC North with a record of 7–8–1, their best record since the 2007 season. However, they missed the playoffs for the 16th consecutive season, having last made the playoffs in 2002.

On September 9, the Browns opened their season against the Pittsburgh Steelers with a 21–21 tie. This was the Browns' first tie since 1989, and it ended a 17-game losing streak which dated back to the 2016 season. On September 20, the Browns defeated the New York Jets 21–17, ending a 19-game winless streak.

On October 29, Jackson was fired after posting a record of 2–5–1 through Week 8 and an overall record of 3–36–1 during his two and a half seasons in Cleveland. Offensive coordinator Todd Haley, who was in his first season with the Browns, was fired the same day. Defensive coordinator Gregg Williams was named interim head coach. Under Williams, the Browns went 5–3 to finish out the season.

Rookie starting quarterback Baker Mayfield threw 27 touchdown passes, breaking the record for the most touchdown passes thrown by a rookie quarterback. The previous record of 26 was shared by Peyton Manning and Russell Wilson, and it was later broken in 2020 by Justin Herbert.

== Offseason ==
=== Front office changes ===
On January 2, new general manager John Dorsey hired Green Bay Packers personnel executive Alonzo Highsmith as vice president of football operations.

On January 10, the Browns announced several front office hirings: Eliot Wolf as assistant general manager, Jimmy Noel as assistant director of pro scouting, Matt Donahoe as a scout, and Dan Zegers as personnel coordinator. The Browns also announced that former vice president of player personnel Ken Kovash would switch to a role within the strategy department, and fired senior personnel executive Ryan Grigson.

=== Coaching changes ===
On January 10, the Browns released special teams coordinator Chris Tabor. He had been the longest-tenured coach on the Browns, with the team since 2011.

On January 11, the Browns hired Adam Henry as wide receivers coach, a position he held with the New York Giants since 2016. Former wide receivers coach Al Saunders transitioned into a senior advisory role.

On January 12, the Browns hired Ken Zampese as quarterbacks coach. They also fired running backs coach/run game coordinator Kirby Wilson, special teams assistant Shawn Mennenga, and special teams quality control coach Stan Watson.

On January 24, the Browns hired Amos Jones as special teams coordinator, Todd Haley as offensive coordinator, and Freddie Kitchens as running backs/assistant head coach.

On February 8, the Browns hired Sam Shade as assistant special teams coach.

On March 9, the Browns hired former return specialist Josh Cribbs as special teams intern.

=== Roster changes ===
==== Re-signings ====
Position	Player	Tag	Date
ILB	Tank Carder	UFA	March 27
WR	Josh Gordon	ERFA	March 14
WR	Matt Hazel	ERFA	March 14
QB	Kevin Hogan	ERFA	March 14
TE	Matt Lengel	ERFA	March 14
DT	Jamie Meder	RFA	March 14
C	Austin Reiter	ERFA	March 14
FB	Danny Vitale	ERFA	March 14
UFA=Unrestricted free agent, RFA=Restricted free agent, ERFA=Exclusive rights free agent

==== Players added ====
Position	Player	Tag	2017 team	Date
CB	T. J. Carrie	UFA	Oakland Raiders	March 14
TE	Orson Charles	UFA	Kansas City Chiefs	July 30
TE	Darren Fells	UFA	Detroit Lions	March 14
CB	E. J. Gaines	UFA	Buffalo Bills	March 23
T	Chris Hubbard	UFA	Pittsburgh Steelers	March 14
RB	Carlos Hyde	UFA	San Francisco 49ers	March 14
WR	Jarvis Landry	Trade (Note: The Browns acquired WR Jarvis Landry from the Miami Dolphins in exchange for a 2018 fourth-round selection (No. 123) and a 2019 seventh-round selection)	Miami Dolphins	March 14
DT	Devaroe Lawrence	Trade (Note: The Browns acquired DT Devaroe Lawrence from the New Orleans Saints in exchange for a 2019 seventh-round draft pick)	New Orleans Saints	September 1
CB	Terrance Mitchell	UFA	Kansas City Chiefs	March 14
S	Damarious Randall	Trade (Note: The Browns acquired S Damarious Randall, a 2018 fourth-round selection (No. 114), and a 2018 fifth-round selection (No. 150) from the Green Bay Packers in exchange for QB Deshone Kizer, a 2018 fourth-round selection (No. 101), and a 2018 fifth-round selection (No. 138))	Green Bay Packers	March 14
T	Greg Robinson	UFA	Detroit Lions	June 19
LB	Brady Sheldon	Waiver	Oakland Raiders	June 13
DE	Chris Smith	UFA	Cincinnati Bengals	March 14
QB	Drew Stanton	UFA	Arizona Cardinals	March 25
QB	Tyrod Taylor	Trade (Note: The Browns acquired QB Tyrod Taylor from the Buffalo Bills in exchange for a 2018 third-round selection (No. 65))	Buffalo Bills	March 14
G	Earl Watford	UFA	Arizona Cardinals	August 28

==== Players lost ====
Position	Player	Tag	2018 team	Date
LB	Dominique Alexander	Release		May 3
LB	B. J. Bello	Release	Arizona Cardinals	September 1
LB	Max Bullough	Release		April 12
DE	Caleb Brantley	Release	Washington Redskins	September 1
LB	Tank Carder	Release		June 5
WR	Corey Coleman	Trade (Note: The Browns acquired a 2020 seventh-round selection from the Buffalo Bills in exchange for WR Corey Coleman)	Buffalo Bills	August 5
T	Shon Coleman	Trade (Note: The Browns acquired a 2019 seventh-round selection from the San Francisco 49ers in exchange for T Shon Coleman)	San Francisco 49ers	August 31
RB	Isaiah Crowell	UFA	New York Jets	March 14
RB	Matthew Dayes	Release	San Francisco 49ers	September 1
T	Spencer Drango	Release	Los Angeles Chargers	September 1
TE	Gavin Escobar	Release	Miami Dolphins	April 12
T	Geoff Gray	Release	Winnipeg Blue Bombers (CFL)	August 28
WR	Matt Hazel	Release	Indianapolis Colts	April 30
QB	Kevin Hogan	Trade (Note: The Browns acquired a 2018 sixth-round selection (No. 188) from the Washington Redskins in exchange for QB Kevin Hogan and a 2018 sixth-round selection (No. 205))	Washington Redskins	April 6
WR	Bug Howard	Release	Carolina Panthers	April 12
RB	Darius Jackson	Release	Dallas Cowboys	May 3
T	Roderick Johnson	Release	Houston Texans	June 19
CB	Mike Jordan	Release	New York Giants	September 1
QB	Cody Kessler	Trade (Note: The Browns acquired a conditional 2019 seventh-round selection from the Jacksonville Jaguars in exchange for QB Cody Kessler)	Jacksonville Jaguars	March 27
OLB	Josh Keyes	UFA	Houston Texans	March 20
QB	DeShone Kizer	Trade	Green Bay Packers	March 14
TE	Matt Lengel	Release	Houston Texans	April 12
G	Marcus Martin	UFA	Dallas Cowboys	March 26
CB	Jason McCourty	Trade (Note: The Browns acquired a 2018 sixth-round selection (No. 205) rom the New England Patriots in exchange for CB Jason McCourty and a 2018 seventh-round draft selection (No. 219))	New England Patriots	March 15
S	Kai Nacua	Release	Baltimore Ravens	April 30
DE	Nate Orchard	Release	Buffalo Bills	September 1
WR	Larry Pinkard	Release		April 12
CB	Reggie Porter	Release		April 20
DT	Danny Shelton	Trade (Note: The Browns acquired a 2019 third-round selection from the New England Patriots in exchange for DT Danny Shelton and a 2018 fifth-round selection (No. 159))	New England Patriots	March 14
CB	C. J. Smith	Release	Denver Broncos	April 12
S	Derron Smith	Release	San Antonio Commanders (AAF)	August 31
CB	Jamar Taylor	Trade (Note: The Browns acquired a 2020 sixth-round selection from the Arizona Cardinals in exchange for CB Jamar Taylor)	Arizona Cardinals	May 19
RB	Kelvin Taylor	Release	Orlando Apollos (AAF)	April 12
TE	Randall Telfer	Release	Indianapolis Colts	May 4
T	Joe Thomas	Retired		March 14
CB	Simeon Thomas	Release	Seattle Seahawks	September 1
CB	Corey White	Release		April 20
WR	Kasen Williams	Release	Indianapolis Colts	April 30

Trade notes

==== Players added and lost ====
The Browns added and released the following players during the 2018 off-season:

- C Anthony Fabiano
- T Avery Gennesy
- LB Jermaine Grace
- WR Jeff Janis
- LB Mychal Kendricks
- K Ross Martin
- CB Jeremiah McKinnon
- QB Joel Stave
- T Donald Stephenson (retired)
- P Justin Vogel

==== 2018 draft class ====
2018 Cleveland Browns draft
Round	Pick	Player	Position	College	Notes
1	1	Baker Mayfield *	QB	Oklahoma	
1	4	Denzel Ward *	CB	Ohio St	Pick from HOU
2	33	Austin Corbett	OT	Nevada	
2	35	Nick Chubb *	RB	Georgia	Pick from HOU
3	67	Chad Thomas	DE	Miami (FL)	Pick from IND
4	105	Antonio Callaway	WR	Florida	Pick from CHI
5	150	Genard Avery	LB	Memphis	Pick from GB
6	175	Damion Ratley	WR	Texas A&M	
6	188	Simeon Thomas	CB	Louisiana	Pick from WAS
Made roster † Pro Football Hall of Fame * Made at least one Pro Bowl during career

==== Undrafted free agents ====
2018 Cleveland Browns UDFA
Player	Position	College	Signed	Cut
Drew Bailey	DT	Louisville	May 1	August 28
Stephen Baggett	TE	East Carolina	August 18	August 31
Evan Berry	WR	Tennessee	May 1	August 28
Christian Boutte	CB	Nicholls	July 30	August 31
D.J. Calhoun	LB	Arizona State	May 1	August 27
Elijah Campbell	S	Northern Iowa	May 1	August 31
Christian DiLauro	T	Illinois	May 1	September 1
Daniel Ekuale	DT	Washington State	May 1	September 1
Marcell Frazier *	DE	Missouri	May 18	August 28
DeMarquis Gates	LB	Ole Miss	May 22	June 14
Micah Hannemann	S	BYU	May 1	August 18
Desmond Harrison	T	West Georgia	May 1	
Zaycoven Henderson	DT	Texas A&M	May 1	September 1
Blake Jackson	WR	Mary Hardin–Baylor	July 28	August 31
Montrel Meander	S	Grambling State	May 1	September 1
Brogan Roback	QB	Eastern Michigan	May 14	August 28
Da'Mari Scott	WR	Fresno State	May 1	September 1
Trenton Thompson	DT	Georgia	May 1	July 30
Derrick Willies	WR	Texas Tech	May 1	
Blaine Woodson *	DT	Delaware	August 15	August 31
Erick Wren	C	Oklahoma	May 1	July 28
A green background indicates the player made the Browns' Week 1 53-man roster

* Browns claimed player off waivers after he signed as an undrafted free agent with another team and was waived.

== Staff ==
2018 Cleveland Browns staff
Front office: Owners – Jimmy and Dee Haslam; Executive VP – JW Johnson; Chief strategy officer – Paul DePodesta; Chief operations officer – David Jenkins; General manager – John Dorsey; Assistant general manager – Eliot Wolf; VP player personnel – Andrew Berry, Alonzo Highsmith, Ken Kovash; Vice president, football administration – Chris Cooper; Director of research & strategy – Kevin Meers; Director of scouting – Mike Cetta; Assistant director of scouting – Glenn Cook; Director of college scouting – Steve Malin; Director of pro scouting – Dan Saganey; Salary cap & contract analyst – Brandon Sosna; Assistant director of pro scouting – Jim Noel; Special advisor – Jim Brown; Head coaches: Head coach – Hue Jackson; Associate head coach/interim offensive coordinator/running backs – Freddie Kitchens; Offensive coaches: Offensive coordinator – Todd Haley; Quarterbacks – Ken Zampese; Running backs – Ryan Lindley; Wide receivers – Adam Henry; Tight ends – Greg Seamon; Offensive line – Bob Wylie; Assistant offensive line – Mark Hutson; Offensive quality control – Brian Braswell; Offensive quality control/assistant wide receivers – Bob Saunders	Defensive coaches: Interim head coach/defensive coordinator – Gregg Williams; Defensive line – Clyde Simmons; Assistant defensive line – Ken Delgado; Interim defensive coordinator/linebackers – Blake Williams; Defensive backs – DeWayne Walker; Assistant defensive backs – Jerod Kruse; Defensive quality control – Eric Sanders; Special teams coaches: Special teams coordinator – Amos Jones; Assistant special teams – Sam Shade; Senior assistant/special projects – Al Saunders; Strength and conditioning: Head of strength and conditioning – Larry Jackson; Strength and conditioning coordinator – Evan Marcus; Strength and conditioning assistant – Josh Christovich; Strength and conditioning assistant – Monty Gibson; Strength and conditioning assistant – Dale Jones; Director, high performance – Adam Beard; Sports scientist – Jamey Mroz

== Final roster ==
2018 Cleveland Browns roster
Quarterbacks (QB): 6 Baker Mayfield; 9 Drew Stanton; 5 Tyrod Taylor; Running backs (RB): 24 Nick Chubb; 25 Dontrell Hilliard; 29 Duke Johnson; Wide receivers (WR): 11 Antonio Callaway; 81 Rashard Higgins; 12 Blake Jackson; 80 Jarvis Landry; 19 Breshad Perriman; 18 Damion Ratley; Tight ends (TE): 87 Seth DeValve; 88 Darren Fells; 85 David Njoku	Offensive linemen (OL): 75 Joel Bitonio G; 63 Austin Corbett G; 69 Desmond Harrison T; 74 Chris Hubbard T; 68 Kyle Kalis G/C; 78 Greg Robinson T; 64 JC Tretter C; 71 Earl Watford G; 70 Kevin Zeitler G; Defensive linemen (DL): 93 Trevon Coley DT; 94 Carl Davis DT; 95 Myles Garrett DE; 90 Emmanuel Ogbah DE; 65 Larry Ogunjobi DT; 91 Brian Price DT; 50 Chris Smith DE; 92 Chad Thomas DE; 97 Anthony Zettel DE	Linebackers (LB): 52 Ray-Ray Armstrong MLB; 55 Genard Avery OLB; 51 Jamie Collins OLB; 59 D'Juan Hines OLB; 53 Joe Schobert MLB; 56 Xavier Woodson-Luster OLB; Defensive backs (DB): 20 Briean Boddy-Calhoun CB; 31 Juston Burris CB; 38 T. J. Carrie CB; 37 Denzel Rice CB; 26 Derrick Kindred SS; 39 Terrance Mitchell CB; 22 Jabrill Peppers SS/RS; 23 Damarious Randall FS; 27 Tavierre Thomas CB; 21 Denzel Ward CB; 35 Jermaine Whitehead FS; Special teams (ST): 4 Britton Colquitt P; 47 Charley Hughlett LS; 17 Greg Joseph K	Practice squad: 96 Daniel Ekuale DT (Susp.); 62 Jake Eldrenkamp G; 79 Kyle Friend C; 61 Mason Gentry G; 34 Robert Jackson CB (IR); 36 Ashton Lampkin CB; 99 Devaroe Lawrence DT; 42 Devante Mays RB; 41 Lenzy Pipkins CB; 40 Tigie Sankoh FS (IPP); 60 Brad Seaton T; 10 Daniel Williams WR; Reserve: 86 Pharaoh Brown TE (IR); 82 Orson Charles TE (IR); 28 E. J. Gaines CB (IR); 91 Lenny Jones DE (IR); 58 Christian Kirksey (IR); 15 Ricardo Louis WR (IR); 13 Rod Streater WR (IR); 54 Tanner Vallejo OLB (IR); 84 Derrick Willies WR (IR); 24 Howard Wilson CB (IR); Rookies in italics 53 active, 12 reserve, 10 practice squad

== Preseason ==
The Browns opened training camp on July 26. The Browns' training camp and preseason was featured on the HBO series Hard Knocks.

=== Schedule ===
Week	Date	Opponent	Result	Record	Venue	Recap
1	August 9	at New York Giants	W 20–10	1–0	MetLife Stadium	Recap
2	August 17	Buffalo Bills	L 17–19	1–1	FirstEnergy Stadium	Recap
3	August 23	Philadelphia Eagles	W 5–0	2–1	FirstEnergy Stadium	Recap
4	August 30	at Detroit Lions	W 35–17	3–1	Ford Field	Recap

=== Notes ===
- WR Josh Gordon did not report to the beginning of training camp as part of his "overall health and treatment plan." He returned to the team on August 18.
- On August 29, federal charges were brought against LB Mychal Kendricks for insider trading, in which he allegedly made $1.2 million in profits on illegal trades made between 2014 and 2017. The team released Kendricks on August 30.

=== Roster cuts ===
The Browns waived the following players between August 28 and September 1 to get their roster down to the 53-player maximum.

- TE Stephen Baggett
- LB B. J. Bello
- WR Evan Berry
- WR C. J. Board
- CB Christian Boutte
- DE Caleb Brantley
- TE Devon Cajuste
- S Elijah Campbell
- LB Justin Currie
- RB Matthew Dayes
- G Christian DiLauro
- T Spencer Drango
- DT Daniel Ekuale
- C Anthony Fabiano
- DE Jeremy Faulk
- DT Marcel Frazier
- G Avery Gennesy
- T Geoff Gray
- DT Zaycoven Henderson
- RB Dontrell Hilliard
- WR Blake Jackson
- WR Jeff Janis
- DE Lenny Jones
- CB Mike Jordan
- G Fred Lauina
- S Montrel Meander
- K Ross Martin
- DE Nate Orchard
- QB Brogan Roback
- S Tigie Sankoh
- WR Da'Mari Scott
- LB Brady Sheldon
- S Derron Smith
- S Simeon Thomas
- FB Danny Vitale
- P Justin Vogel
- DE Blaine Woodson

The Browns also traded T Shon Coleman and acquired DT Devaroe Lawrence in a separate trade.

On September 2, the Browns added DT Carl Davis, DE Ifeadi Odenigbo, C Aaron Neary, LB Tanner Vallejo, and Tavierre Thomas, who were all waived by their former teams. To make room on the roster, the Browns waived LB Jermaine Grace, CB Jeremiah McKinnon, DT Jamie Meder, DE Carl Nassib, and C Austin Reiter.

On September 3, the Browns signed Ekuale, Henderson, Hilliard, G Kyle Kalis, TE Pharoah McKever, McKinnon, Meander, Scott, T Brad Seaton, and Shelton to their practice squad. Sankoh, who is part of the NFL's International Player Pathway program, was also added to the practice squad and does not count toward its 10-player limit.

== Regular season ==
=== Schedule ===
Week	Date	Opponent	Result	Record	Venue	Recap
1	September 9	**Pittsburgh Steelers**	**T** 21–21 (OT)	0–0–1	FirstEnergy Stadium	Recap
2	September 16	at New Orleans Saints	**L** 18–21	0–1–1	Mercedes-Benz Superdome	Recap
3	September 20	New York Jets	**W** 21–17	1–1–1	FirstEnergy Stadium	Recap
4	September 30	at Oakland Raiders	**L** 42–45 (OT)	1–2–1	Oakland–Alameda County Coliseum	Recap
5	October 7	**Baltimore Ravens**	**W** 12–9 (OT)	2–2–1	FirstEnergy Stadium	Recap
6	October 14	Los Angeles Chargers	**L** 14–38	2–3–1	FirstEnergy Stadium	Recap
7	October 21	at Tampa Bay Buccaneers	**L** 23–26 (OT)	2–4–1	Raymond James Stadium	Recap
8	October 28	at **Pittsburgh Steelers**	**L** 18–33	2–5–1	Heinz Field	Recap
9	November 4	Kansas City Chiefs	**L** 21–37	2–6–1	FirstEnergy Stadium	Recap
10	November 11	Atlanta Falcons	**W** 28–16	3–6–1	FirstEnergy Stadium	Recap
11	Bye					
12	November 25	at **Cincinnati Bengals**	**W** 35–20	4–6–1	Paul Brown Stadium	Recap
13	December 2	at Houston Texans	**L** 13–29	4–7–1	NRG Stadium	Recap
14	December 9	Carolina Panthers	**W** 26–20	5–7–1	FirstEnergy Stadium	Recap
15	December 15	at Denver Broncos	**W** 17–16	6–7–1	Broncos Stadium at Mile High	Recap
16	December 23	**Cincinnati Bengals**	**W** 26–18	7–7–1	FirstEnergy Stadium	Recap
17	December 30	at **Baltimore Ravens**	**L** 24–26	7–8–1	M&T Bank Stadium	Recap

Note: Intra-division opponents are in bold text.

=== Game summaries ===
==== Week 1: vs. Pittsburgh Steelers ====
Week One: Pittsburgh Steelers at Cleveland Browns – Game summary

Quarter	1	2	3	4	OT	Total
Steelers	0	7	14	0	0	**21**
Browns	0	0	7	14	0	**21**

at FirstEnergy Stadium, Cleveland, Ohio

- Date: September 9
- Game time: 1:00 p.m. EDT
- Game weather: Rain, 58 °F (14 °C)
- Game attendance: 67,431
- Referee: Shawn Smith
- TV announcers (CBS): Greg Gumbel, Trent Green, Bruce Arians, and Melanie Collins
- Recap, Gamebook

Game information

**First quarter**

- No scoring plays.

**Second quarter**

- PIT – James Conner 4-yard run (Chris Boswell kick), 11:16. Steelers 7–0. **Drive: 10 plays, 88 yards, 5:39.**

**Third quarter**

- CLE – Tyrod Taylor 20-yard run (Zane Gonzalez kick), 10:05. Tied 7–7. **Drive: 10 plays, 86 yards, 4:55.**
- PIT – Antonio Brown 22-yard pass from Ben Roethlisberger (Chris Boswell kick), 8:24. Steelers 14–7. **Drive: 3 plays, 74 yards, 1:41.**
- PIT – James Conner 22-yard run (Chris Boswell kick), 5:29. Steelers 21–7. **Drive: 2 plays, 39 yards, 0:45.**

**Fourth quarter**

- CLE – Carlos Hyde 1-yard run (Zane Gonzalez kick), 7:32. Steelers 21–14. **Drive: 1 play, 1 yard, 0:04.**
- CLE – Josh Gordon 17-yard pass from Tyrod Taylor (Zane Gonzalez kick), 1:58. Tied 21–21. **Drive: 2 plays, 55 yards, 0:12.**

**Overtime**

- No scoring plays.

**Top passers**

- PIT – Ben Roethlisberger – 23/41, 335 yards, TD, 3 INT
- CLE – Tyrod Taylor – 15/40, 197 yards, TD, INT

**Top rushers**

- PIT – James Conner – 31 rushes, 135 yards, 2 TD
- CLE – Tyrod Taylor – 8 rushes, 77 yards, TD

**Top receivers**

- PIT – JuJu Smith-Schuster – 5 receptions, 119 yards
- CLE – Jarvis Landry – 7 receptions, 106 yards

The Browns' defense intercepted Steelers quarterback Ben Roethlisberger three times and recovered three fumbles. Rookie CB Denzel Ward had two of the interceptions for the Browns. Cleveland only had one turnover, with Tyrod Taylor throwing an interception in the 4th quarter. Both teams had a chance to win late in the overtime period, but came up short. Chris Boswell missed a 42-yard field goal for the Steelers, while Browns kicker Zane Gonzalez had his 43-yard attempt blocked with 0:09 left in overtime.

With their first tie since 1989, the Browns started the season at 0–0–1. This tie ended a 17-game losing streak that dated back to the final game of the 2016 season. It also ended streaks of 17 straight losses within the AFC North, 13 straight season-opening losses, and six straight losses to the Steelers. Ward was named the NFL Rookie of the Week for Week 1.

==== Week 2: at New Orleans Saints ====
Week Two: Cleveland Browns at New Orleans Saints – Game summary

Quarter	1	2	3	4	Total
Browns	3	3	6	6	**18**
**Saints**	3	0	0	18	**21**

at Mercedes-Benz Superdome, New Orleans, Louisiana

- Date: September 16
- Game time: 1:00 pm. EDT/12:00 p.m. CDT
- Game weather: None (indoor stadium)
- Game attendance: 73,086
- Referee: Ronald Torbert
- TV announcers (Fox): Chris Myers, Daryl Johnston, and Laura Okmin
- Recap, Gamebook

Game information

**First quarter**

- CLE – Zane Gonzalez 39-yard field goal, 8:29. Browns 3–0. **Drive: 6 plays, 25 yards, 3:02.**
- NO – Wil Lutz 31-yard field goal, 2:47. Tied 3–3. **Drive: 11 plays, 63 yards, 5:42.**

**Second quarter**

- CLE – Zane Gonzalez 39-yard field goal, 1:55. Browns 6–3. **Drive: 7 plays, 45 yards, 2:21.**

**Third quarter**

- CLE – Carlos Hyde 1-yard run (PAT failed), 6:43. Browns 12–3. **Drive: 12 plays, 79 yards, 6:27.**

**Fourth quarter**

- NO – Michael Thomas 2-yard pass from Drew Brees (Wil Lutz kick), 8:41. Browns 12–10. **Drive: 9 plays, 66 yards, 5:35.**
- NO – Michael Thomas 5-yard pass from Drew Brees (Alvin Kamara run), 2:40. Saints 18–12. **Drive: 4 plays, 18 yards, 2:17.**
- CLE – Antonio Callaway 47-yard pass from Tyrod Taylor (PAT failed), 1:16. Tied 18–18. **Drive: 6 plays, 75 yards, 1:24.**
- NO – Wil Lutz 44-yard field goal, 0:21. Saints 21–18. **Drive: 6 plays, 49 yards, 0:55.**

**Top passers**

- CLE – Tyrod Taylor – 22/30, 246 yards, TD, INT
- NO – Drew Brees – 28/35, 243 yards, 2 TD

**Top rushers**

- CLE – Carlos Hyde – 16 rushes, 43 yards, TD
- NO – Alvin Kamara – 13 rushes, 46 yards

**Top receivers**

- CLE – Antonio Callaway – 3 receptions, 81 yards, TD
- NO – Michael Thomas – 12 receptions, 89 yards, 2 TD

The teams exchanged field goals in the first quarter, then Browns K Zane Gonzalez kicked his second field goal late in the second quarter to give the Browns a 6–3 halftime lead. Carlos Hyde scored a touchdown on a short run to give the Browns a 12–3 lead, but the Saints scored 15 straight points in the fourth quarter to take an 18–12 lead. The Browns answered with a tying touchdown on a 47-yard Tyrod Taylor Hail Mary pass to Antonio Callaway with 1:16 remaining. However, Gonzalez missed the extra point attempt, his second miss of the day, which would have given the Browns the lead. Saints K Wil Lutz nailed a 44-yard game-winner with 0:21 remaining. The Browns drove to give Gonzalez an attempt at a 52-yard field goal to tie the game in the final seconds, but it sailed wide right.

With the loss, the Browns fell to 0–1–1. Their winless streak extended to 19 games.

The next day, the Browns released Gonzalez and signed rookie K Greg Joseph. Joseph played college football at Florida Atlantic and was on the Miami Dolphins' training camp roster. The Browns also traded WR Josh Gordon and a 2019 seventh-round selection to the New England Patriots for a 2019 fifth-round selection.

==== Week 3: vs. New York Jets ====
Week Three: New York Jets at Cleveland Browns – Game summary

Quarter	1	2	3	4	Total
Jets	0	14	0	3	**17**
**Browns**	0	3	11	7	**21**

at FirstEnergy Stadium, Cleveland, Ohio

- Date: September 20
- Game time: 8:20 pm. EDT
- Game weather: Clear, 83 °F (28 °C)
- Game attendance: 67,431
- Referee: Jerome Boger
- TV announcers (NFLN): Joe Buck, Troy Aikman, Erin Andrews, Kristina Pink, and Mike Pereira
- Recap, Gamebook

Game information

**First quarter**

- No scoring plays.

**Second quarter**

- NYJ – Isaiah Crowell 7-yard run (Jason Myers kick), 14:56. Jets 7–0. **Drive: 5 plays, 28 yards, 2:17.**
- NYJ – Isaiah Crowell 2-yard run (Jason Myers kick), 7:54. Jets 14–0. **Drive: 10 plays, 63 yards, 5:37.**
- CLE – Greg Joseph 45-yard field goal, 0:27. Jets 14–3. **Drive: 6 plays, 39 yards, 1:19.**

**Third quarter**

- CLE – Greg Joseph 27-yard field goal, 5:24. Jets 14–6. **Drive: 4 plays, 0 yards, 0:55.**
- CLE – Carlos Hyde 1-yard run (Jarvis Landry–Baker Mayfield pass), 0:47. Tied 14–14. **Drive: 7 plays, 69 yards, 2:49.**

**Fourth quarter**

- NYJ – Jason Myers 28-yard field goal, 8:58. Jets 17–14. **Drive: 12 plays, 65 yards, 6:44.**
- CLE – Carlos Hyde 1-yard run (Greg Joseph kick), 2:04. Browns 21–17. **Drive: 15 plays, 75 yards, 6:52.**

**Top passers**

- NYJ – Sam Darnold – 15/31, 169 yards, 2 INT
- CLE – Baker Mayfield – 17/23, 201 yards

**Top rushers**

- NYJ – Bilal Powell – 14 rushes, 73 yards
- CLE – Carlos Hyde – 23 rushes, 98 yards, 2 TD

**Top receivers**

- NYJ – Quincy Enunwa – 4 receptions, 57 yards
- CLE – Jarvis Landry – 8 receptions, 103 yards

Rookie quarterback Baker Mayfield entered the game in the 2nd quarter after starter Tyrod Taylor left the game with a concussion. Taylor finished the game 4/14 for 19 yards. Mayfield threw for 201 yards and a caught a pass from receiver Jarvis Landry for a two-point conversion (a Philly Special that had been flipped to account for Landry being left-handed). Carlos Hyde added two touchdown runs including the go-ahead score with just over two minutes remaining. The Jets offense could not respond as QB Sam Darnold threw a pair of interceptions in the Jets' final two drives to preserve the 21–17 win.

With the win, the Browns improved to 1–1–1. This win marked the end of the team's 19-game winless streak and the team's first win in 635 days (their last win was on December 24, 2016). Mayfield was named the NFL Rookie of the Week for Week 3.

On September 24, Mayfield was named the team's starting quarterback moving forward.

==== Week 4: at Oakland Raiders ====
Week Four: Cleveland Browns at Oakland Raiders – Game summary

Quarter	1	2	3	4	OT	Total
Browns	3	14	11	14	0	**42**
**Raiders**	7	7	7	21	3	**45**

at Oakland–Alameda County Coliseum, Oakland, California

- Date: September 30
- Game time: 4:05 pm. EDT/1:05 p.m. PDT
- Game weather: Partly cloudy, 71 °F (22 °C)
- Game attendance: 53,387
- Referee: Walt Anderson
- TV announcers (Fox): Kenny Albert, Ronde Barber, and Megan Olivi
- Recap, Gamebook

Game information

**First quarter**

- OAK – Gareon Conley 36-yard interception return (Matt McCrane kick), 10:01. Raiders 7–0.
- CLE – Greg Joseph 25-yard field goal, 2:00. Raiders 7–3. **Drive: 15 plays, 68 yards, 8:01.**

**Second quarter**

- CLE – Nick Chubb 63-yard run (run failed), 12:35. Browns 9–7. **Drive: 1 play, 63 yards, 0:11.**
- CLE – Darren Fells 49-yard pass from Baker Mayfield (Duke Johnson run), 9:00. Browns 17–7. **Drive: 4 plays, 70 yards, 1:58.**
- OAK – Amari Cooper 8-yard pass from Derek Carr (Matt McCrane kick), 4:30. Browns 17–14. **Drive: 8 plays, 75 yards, 4:30.**

**Third quarter**

- CLE – Greg Joseph 28-yard field goal, 9:22. Browns 20–14. **Drive: 11 plays, 65 yards, 5:38.**
- CLE – Jarvis Landry 2-yard pass from Baker Mayfield (Duke Johnson run), 7:26. Browns 28–14. **Drive: 2 plays, 31 yards, 0:51.**
- OAK – Jared Cook 7-yard pass from Derek Carr (Matt McCrane kick), 5:34. Browns 28–21. **Drive: 3 plays, 7 yards, 0:11.**

**Fourth quarter**

- OAK – Matt McCrane 29-yard field goal, 14:17. Browns 28–24. **Drive: 6 plays, 58 yards, 2:07.**
- OAK – Jordy Nelson 19-yard pass from Derek Carr (Matt McCrane kick), 12:46. Raiders 31–28. **Drive: 2 plays, 20 yards, 0:40.**
- OAK – Matt McCrane 44-yard field goal, 10:46. Raiders 34–28. **Drive: 4 plays, 3 yards, 1:26.**
- CLE – Carlos Hyde 1-yard run (Greg Joseph kick), 8:07. Browns 35–34. **Drive: 7 plays, 77 yards, 2:39.**
- CLE – Nick Chubb 41-yard run (Greg Joseph kick), 4:20. Browns 42–34. **Drive: 3 plays, 63 yards, 1:25.**
- OAK – Jared Cook 7-yard pass from Derek Carr (Derek Carr pass to Jordy Nelson), 0:30. Tied 42–42. **Drive: 6 plays, 53 yards, 0:58.**

**Overtime**

- OAK – Matt McCrane 29-yard field goal, 1:46. Raiders 45–42. **Drive: 11 plays, 70 yards, 3:41.**

**Top passers**

- CLE – Baker Mayfield – 21/41, 295 yards, 2 TD, 2 INT
- OAK – Derek Carr – 35/58, 437 yards, 4 TD, 2 INT

**Top rushers**

- CLE – Nick Chubb – 3 rushes, 105 yards, TD
- OAK – Marshawn Lynch – 20 rushes, 130 yards

**Top receivers**

- CLE – Rashard Higgins – 4 receptions, 61 yards
- OAK – Amari Cooper – 8 receptions, 128 yards, TD

The Browns took a 17–7 lead into halftime on the strength of Nick Chubb's first career touchdown run and Baker Mayfield's first career touchdown pass, although Mayfield also threw an interception that was returned for a Raiders touchdown. The Browns built up a 28–14 lead in the third quarter, but the Raiders then scored 20 straight points aided by two Mayfield fumbles and a 51-yard punt return which gave the Raiders short fields to work with. The Browns finally answered with touchdown runs by Carlos Hyde and Chubb to take a 42–34 lead in the fourth quarter. The Browns were unable to run the clock out and punted to the Raiders, giving them one last opportunity to tie the game. The Raiders scored a touchdown and game-tying two-point conversion with 0:30 left, to send the game into overtime. The Raiders won the game, 45–42 on a Matt McCrane field goal in the overtime period. This was the first time the Browns scored 30 or more points since 2015, and the first time the team scored 40 or more points since 2009.

With the loss, the Browns fell to 1–2–1. Chubb was named NFL Rookie of the Week after his 105-yard, two-touchdown performance.

==== Week 5: vs. Baltimore Ravens ====
Week Five: Baltimore Ravens at Cleveland Browns – Game summary

Quarter	1	2	3	4	OT	Total
Ravens	3	0	3	3	0	**9**
**Browns**	0	6	3	0	3	**12**

at FirstEnergy Stadium, Cleveland, Ohio

- Date: October 7
- Game time: 1:00 pm. EDT
- Game weather: Cloudy, 72 °F (22 °C)
- Game attendance: 67,431
- Referee: Clay Martin
- TV announcers (CBS): Andrew Catalon, James Lofton, and John Schriffen
- Recap, Gamebook

Game information

**First quarter**

- BAL – Justin Tucker 44-yard field goal, 8:37. Ravens 3–0. **Drive: 4 plays, 7 yards, 0:56.**

**Second quarter**

- CLE – Rashard Higgins 19-yard pass from Baker Mayfield (PAT failed), 0:40. Browns 6–3. **Drive: 6 plays, 78 yards, 1:19.**

**Third quarter**

- CLE – Greg Joseph 35-yard field goal, 7:29. Browns 9–3. **Drive: 8 plays, 25 yards, 2:59.**
- BAL – Justin Tucker 25-yard field goal, 0:53. Browns 9–6. **Drive: 13 plays, 68 yards, 6:36.**

**Fourth quarter**

- BAL – Justin Tucker 32-yard field goal, 0:52. Tied 9–9. **Drive: 11 plays, 52 yards, 3:37.**

**Overtime**

- CLE – Greg Joseph 37-yard field goal, 0:02. Browns 12–9. **Drive: 7 plays, 65 yards, 2:55.**

**Top passers**

- CLE – Baker Mayfield – 25/43, 342 yards, TD, INT
- BAL – Joe Flacco – 29/56, 298 yards, INT

**Top rushers**

- BAL – Alex Collins – 12 rushes, 59 yards
- CLE – Carlos Hyde – 17 rushes, 63 yards

**Top receivers**

- BAL – Michael Crabtree – 6 receptions, 66 yards
- CLE – David Njoku – 6 receptions, 69 yards

Both offenses struggled to gain any rhythm during the game. The Ravens could only score nine points on three Justin Tucker field goals, while the Browns scored nine points on a Baker Mayfield touchdown pass to Rashard Higgins and a Greg Joseph field goal. Joseph, who missed an extra point, had an opportunity to win the game at the end of regulation, but missed a 55-yard field goal attempt. In overtime, both teams were held scoreless during their first two possessions. However, with 0:02 remaining, Joseph hit a 37-yard field goal to win the game.

With the win, the Browns improved to 2–2–1. The Browns ended an 18-game winless streak within the AFC North that dated back to the 2015 season. CB Denzel Ward, who recorded an interception and a blocked field goal, was named NFL Rookie of the Week for the second time this season. It also marked the fourth time in five weeks a Browns player won the award. Ward was also named the AFC special teams player of the week. Jarvis Landry recorded his 427th career reception, passing Larry Fitzgerald for the most receptions in his first five NFL seasons.

==== Week 6: vs. Los Angeles Chargers ====
Week Six: Los Angeles Chargers at Cleveland Browns – Game summary

Quarter	1	2	3	4	Total
**Chargers**	7	14	14	3	**38**
Browns	0	6	0	8	**14**

at FirstEnergy Stadium, Cleveland, Ohio

- Date: October 14
- Game time: 1:00 pm. EDT
- Game weather: Sunny, 51 °F (11 °C)
- Game attendance: 67,431
- Referee: Brad Allen
- TV announcers (CBS): Spero Dedes and Adam Archuleta
- Recap, Gamebook

Game information

**First quarter**

- LAC – Melvin Gordon 4-yard run (Michael Badgley kick), 10:14. Chargers 7–0. **Drive: 5 plays, 57 yards, 2:32.**

**Second quarter**

- CLE – Greg Joseph 33-yard field goal, 12:47. Chargers 7–3. **Drive: 7 plays, 18 yards, 2:13.**
- LAC – Tyrell Williams 45-yard pass from Philip Rivers (Michael Badgley kick), 6:34. Chargers 14–3. **Drive: 2 plays, 89 yards, 1:12.**
- LAC – Tyrell Williams 29-yard pass from Philip Rivers (Michael Badgley kick), 0:51. Chargers 21–3. **Drive: 6 plays, 77 yards, 1:22.**
- CLE – Greg Joseph 28-yard field goal, 0:00. Chargers 21–6. **Drive: 8 plays, 59 yards, 0:51.**

**Third quarter**

- LAC – Melvin Gordon 10-yard run (Michael Badgley kick), 11:49. Chargers 28–6. **Drive: 1 plays, 10 yards, 0:05.**
- LAC – Melvin Gordon 11-yard run (Michael Badgley kick), 3:12. Chargers 35–6. **Drive: 11 plays, 81 yards, 7:10.**

**Fourth quarter**

- CLE – David Njoku 1-yard pass from Baker Mayfield (Baker Mayfield-Antonio Callaway pass), 12:26. Chargers 35–14. **Drive: 7 plays, 42 yards, 1:50.**
- LAC – Michael Badgley 44-yard field goal, 4:15. Chargers 38–14. **Drive: 5 plays, 9 yards, 2:37.**

**Top passers**

- LAC – Philip Rivers – 11/20, 207 yards, 2 TD, INT
- CLE – Baker Mayfield – 22/46, 238 yards, TD, 2 INT

**Top rushers**

- LAC – Melvin Gordon – 18 rushes, 132 yards, 3 TD
- CLE – Duke Johnson – 2 rushes, 36 yards

**Top receivers**

- LAC – Keenan Allen – 4 receptions, 62 yards
- CLE – David Njoku – 7 receptions, 55 yards, TD

The Chargers dominated the game. Chargers' quarterback Philip Rivers passed for 207 yards, two touchdowns, and one interception and running back Melvin Gordon added 132 rushing yards and three touchdowns. The Los Angeles defense sacked Browns' quarterback Baker Mayfield five times and had two interceptions. The Chargers defeated the Browns 38–14.

With the loss, the Browns fell to 2–3–1.

On October 19, the Browns traded RB Carlos Hyde to the Jacksonville Jaguars in exchange for a 2019 fifth-round selection.

==== Week 7: at Tampa Bay Buccaneers ====
Week Seven: Cleveland Browns at Tampa Bay Buccaneers – Game summary

Quarter	1	2	3	4	OT	Total
Browns	2	0	7	14	0	**23**
**Buccaneers**	3	13	7	0	3	**26**

at Raymond James Stadium, Tampa, Florida

- Date: October 21
- Game time: 1:00 pm. EDT
- Game weather: Clear, 79 °F (26 °C)
- Game attendance: 53,682
- Referee: Shawn Hochuli
- TV announcers (Fox): Sam Rosen, Ronde Barber, and Shane Bacon
- Recap, Gamebook

Game information

**First quarter**

- CLE – Safety, Trevon Coley tackled Peyton Barber in the end zone, 9:22. Browns 2–0.
- TB – Chandler Catanzaro 38-yard field goal, 3:04. Buccaneers 3–2. **Drive: 11 plays, 52 yards, 4:26.**

**Second quarter**

- TB – DeSean Jackson 14-yard run, (PAT failed), 15:00. Buccaneers 9–2. **Drive: 6 plays, 55 yards, 1:44.**
- TB – Jameis Winston 14-yard run, (Chandler Catanzaro kick), 8:05. Buccaneers 16–2. **Drive: 10 plays, 76 yards, 5:22.**

**Third quarter**

- CLE – David Njoku 15-yard pass from Baker Mayfield, (Greg Joseph kick), 13:08. Buccaneers 16–9. **Drive: 3 plays, 26 yards, 1:22.**
- TB – Ronald Jones 2-yard run, (Chandler Catanzaro kick), 0:32. Buccaneers 23–9. **Drive: 13 plays, 73 yards, 6:30.**

**Fourth quarter**

- CLE – Nick Chubb 1-yard run, (Greg Joseph kick), 12:25. Buccaneers 23–16. **Drive: 7 plays, 51 yards, 3:11.**
- CLE – Jarvis Landry 16-yard pass from Baker Mayfield, (Greg Joseph kick), 2:36. Tied 23–23. **Drive: 1 play, 16 yards, 0:08.**

**Overtime**

- TB – Chandler Catanzaro 59-yard field goal, 1:55. Buccaneers 26–23. **Drive: 6 plays, 2 yards, 1:22.**

**Top passers**

- CLE – Baker Mayfield – 23/34, 215 yards, 2 TD
- TB – Jameis Winston – 32/52, 365 yards, 2 INT

**Top rushers**

- CLE – Nick Chubb – 18 rushes, 80 yards, TD
- TB – Jameis Winston – 10 rushes, 55 yards, TD

**Top receivers**

- CLE – Jarvis Landry – 10 receptions, 97 yards, TD
- TB – Mike Evans – 7 receptions, 107 yards

The Buccaneers opened a 16–2 lead in the second quarter on the a Jameis Winston touchdown pass to DeSean Jackson and a Winston touchdown run. The Browns answered early in the third quarter with a Baker Mayfield touchdown pass to David Njoku, but Tampa Bay answered on a Ronald Jones run near the end of the quarter. The Browns scored two touchdowns in the fourth quarter on a Nick Chubb run and a Mayfield pass to Jarvis Landry to force overtime. In overtime, Buccaneers kicker Chandler Catanzaro, who had earlier missed an extra point and a 40-yard field goal attempt, hit a 59-yard field goal to win the game.

With the loss, the Browns fell to 2–4–1. Mayfield was named NFL Rookie of the Week for Week 7, marking his second such honor and the fifth time a Browns player was named Rookie of the Week this season.

==== Week 8: at Pittsburgh Steelers ====
Week Eight: Cleveland Browns at Pittsburgh Steelers – Game summary

Quarter	1	2	3	4	Total
Browns	6	0	6	6	**18**
**Steelers**	0	14	9	10	**33**

at Heinz Field, Pittsburgh, Pennsylvania

- Date: October 28
- Game time: 1:00 pm. EDT
- Game weather: Cloudy, 47 °F (8 °C)
- Game attendance: 63,780
- Referee: Carl Cheffers
- TV announcers (CBS): Ian Eagle, Dan Fouts, and Evan Washburn
- Recap, Gamebook

Game information

**First quarter**

- CLE – Greg Joseph 34-yard field goal, 9:15. Browns 3–0. **Drive: 11 plays, 66 yards, 5:50.**
- CLE – Greg Joseph 45-yard field goal, 2:38. Browns 6–0. **Drive: 6 plays, 29 yards, 2:20.**

**Second quarter**

- PIT – Antonio Brown 43-yard pass from Ben Roethlisberger (Chris Boswell kick), 11:35. Steelers 7–6. **Drive: 6 plays, 69 yards, 2:03.**
- PIT – Antonio Brown 1-yard pass from Ben Roethlisberger (Chris Boswell kick), 0:10. Steelers 14–6. **Drive: 16 plays, 87 yards, 7:12.**

**Third quarter**

- PIT – Penalty on Desmond Harrison assessed in CLE end zone for a safety, 8:13. Steelers 16–6.
- CLE – Antonio Callaway 1-yard pass from Baker Mayfield (kick failed), 5:29. Steelers 16–12. **Drive: 4 plays, 24 yards, 2:43.**
- PIT – James Conner 12-yard run (Chris Boswell kick), 2:49. Steelers 23–12. **Drive: 5 plays, 75 yards, 2:42.**

**Fourth quarter**

- PIT – Chris Boswell 42-yard field goal, 13:33. Steelers 26–12. **Drive: 7 plays, 31 yards, 2:46.**
- PIT – James Conner 22-yard run (Chris Boswell kick), 2:10. Steelers 33–12. **Drive: 10 plays, 65 yards, 5:37.**
- CLE – Seth DeValve 24-yard pass from Baker Mayfield (pass failed), 0:13. Steelers 33–18. **Drive: 9 plays, 75 yards, 1:58.**

**Top passers**

- CLE – Baker Mayfield – 22/36, 180 yards, 2 TD, INT
- PIT – Ben Roethlisberger – 24/36, 257 yards, 2 TD, INT

**Top rushers**

- CLE – Nick Chubb – 18 rushes, 65 yards
- PIT – James Conner – 24 rushes, 146 yards, 2 TD

**Top receivers**

- CLE – Jarvis Landry – 8 receptions, 39 yards
- PIT – Antonio Brown – 6 receptions, 74 yards, 2 TD

The Browns traveled to Pittsburgh for a Week 8 battle with their AFC North rival Steelers. The Browns opened the scoring with a pair of Greg Joseph field goals, but the Steelers answered with two Ben Roethlisberger touchdown passes to Antonio Brown to take a 14–6 lead into halftime. The Browns gave up a safety on a holding penalty early in the third quarter to extend the Steelers' lead to 10, but Pittsburgh failed to secure the ensuing free kick, giving the Browns possession in Pittsburgh territory. The Browns capitalized on a Baker Mayfield touchdown pass to Antonio Callaway, cutting the lead to 16–12. The Steelers then pulled away with 17 straight points and come away with a 33–18 win.

With the loss, the Browns fell to 2–5–1. This marked the Browns' 15th consecutive loss in Pittsburgh.

On October 29, head coach Hue Jackson and offensive coordinator Todd Haley were fired. Defensive coordinator Gregg Williams was named the interim head coach for the remainder of the season. Freddie Kitchens was the interim offensive coordinator.

==== Week 9: vs. Kansas City Chiefs ====
Week Nine: Kansas City Chiefs at Cleveland Browns – Game summary

Quarter	1	2	3	4	Total
**Chiefs**	7	14	13	3	**37**
Browns	3	12	0	6	**21**

at FirstEnergy Stadium, Cleveland, Ohio

- Date: November 4
- Game time: 1:00 pm. EST
- Game weather: Sunny, 53 °F (12 °C)
- Game attendance: 67,431
- Referee: Ronald Torbert
- TV announcers (CBS): Greg Gumbel, Trent Green, Bruce Arians, and Melanie Collins
- Recap, Gamebook

Game information

**First quarter**

- KC – Kareem Hunt 50-yard pass from Patrick Mahomes (Harrison Butker kick), 8:14. Chiefs 7–0. **Drive: 7 plays, 95 yards, 2:43.**
- CLE – Greg Joseph 51-yard field goal, 2:45. Chiefs 7–3. **Drive: 11 plays, 42 yards, 5:29.**

**Second quarter**

- KC – Travis Kelce 11-yard pass from Patrick Mahomes (Harrison Butker kick), 13:30. Chiefs 14–3. **Drive: 7 plays, 75 yards, 4:15.**
- CLE – Nick Chubb 3-yard run (pass failed), 6:29. Chiefs 14–9. **Drive: 12 plays, 75 yards, 7:01.**
- KC – Kareem Hunt 1-yard run (Harrison Butker kick), 2:24. Chiefs 21–9. **Drive: 6 plays, 75 yards, 4:05.**
- CLE – Duke Johnson 19-yard pass from Baker Mayfield (pass failed), 0:26. Chiefs 21–15. **Drive: 9 plays, 79 yards, 1:58.**

**Third quarter**

- KC – Travis Kelce 13-yard pass from Patrick Mahomes (Harrison Butker kick), 10:03. Chiefs 28–15. **Drive: 10 plays, 75 yards, 4:57.**
- KC – Kareem Hunt 10-yard run (kick failed), 7:28. Chiefs 34–15. **Drive: 2 plays, 21 yards, 0:35.**

**Fourth quarter**

- CLE – Duke Johnson 5-yard pass from Baker Mayfield (pass failed), 14:57. Chiefs 34–21. **Drive: 15 plays, 75 yards, 7:31.**

**Top passers**

- KC – Patrick Mahomes – 23/32, 375 yards, 3 TD, INT
- CLE – Baker Mayfield – 29/42, 297 yards, 2 TD, INT

**Top rushers**

- KC – Kareem Hunt – 17 rushes, 91 yards, 2 TD
- CLE – Nick Chubb – 22 rushes, 85 yards, TD

**Top receivers**

- KC – Travis Kelce – 7 receptions, 99 yards, 2 TD
- CLE – Duke Johnson – 9 receptions, 78 yards, 2 TD

With the loss, the Browns fell to 2–6–1. Mayfield was named NFL Rookie of the Week for the third time this season. The Browns have reached a low point where they have now lost 56 of their last 64 games from Week 11 of 2014 up to this point, but the loss provided a spark of a turnaround, as the team would win 5 of 7 to finish the season.

==== Week 10: vs. Atlanta Falcons ====
Week Ten: Atlanta Falcons at Cleveland Browns – Game summary

Quarter	1	2	3	4	Total
Falcons	0	10	0	6	**16**
**Browns**	7	7	14	0	**28**

at FirstEnergy Stadium, Cleveland, Ohio

- Date: November 11
- Game time: 1:00 pm. EST
- Game weather: Sunny, 36 °F (2 °C)
- Game attendance: 62,144
- Referee: Pete Morelli
- TV announcers (Fox): Kenny Albert, Ronde Barber, and Sara Walsh
- Recap, Gamebook

Game information

**First quarter**

- CLE – Rashard Higgins 28-yard pass from Baker Mayfield (Greg Joseph kick), 4:36. Browns 7–0. **Drive: 8 plays, 88 yards, 4:55.**

**Second quarter**

- ATL – Giorgio Tavecchio 40-yard field goal, 12:18. Browns 7–3. **Drive: 14 plays, 53 yards, 7:18.**
- ATL – Julio Jones 1-yard pass from Matt Ryan (Giorgio Tavecchio kick), 5:04. Falcons 10–7. **Drive: 6 plays, 45 yards, 3:26.**
- CLE – Nick Chubb 13-yard pass from Baker Mayfield (Greg Joseph kick), 0:55. Browns 14–10. **Drive: 8 plays, 80 yards, 4:09.**

**Third quarter**

- CLE – Duke Johnson 11-yard pass from Baker Mayfield (Greg Joseph kick), 10:27. Browns 21–10. **Drive: 6 plays, 41 yards, 3:00.**
- CLE – Nick Chubb 92-yard run (Greg Joseph kick), 8:45. Browns 28–10. **Drive: 2 plays, 92 yards, 0:16.**

**Fourth quarter**

- ATL – Austin Hooper 3-yard pass from Matt Ryan (pass failed), 4:24. Browns 28–16. **Drive: 13 plays, 69 yards, 4:03.**

**Top passers**

- ATL – Matt Ryan – 38/52, 330 yards, 2 TD
- CLE – Baker Mayfield – 17/20, 216 yards, 3 TD

**Top rushers**

- ATL – Tevin Coleman – 11 rushes, 44 yards
- CLE – Nick Chubb – 20 rushes, 176 yards, TD

**Top receivers**

- ATL – Julio Jones – 7 receptions, 107 yards, TD
- CLE – Antonio Callaway – 2 receptions, 39 yards

The Browns opened the scoring with a Baker Mayfield touchdown pass to Rashard Higgins – the team's first touchdown scored in the first quarter of any game this season. However, the Falcons scored the next 10 points before the Browns scored a touchdown on a Mayfield pass to Nick Chubb to take a 14–10 led into halftime. The Browns opened up their lead to 28–10 in the third quarter on a Mayfield pass to Duke Johnson and a Chubb run of 92 yards – the longest run in Browns' franchise history. Atlanta added a late fourth-quarter touchdown to make the final score 28–16.

With the win, the Browns went into their bye week at 3–6–1. Chubb was named the FedEx Ground Player of the Week and the NFL Rookie of the Week. This marked Chubb's second Rookie of the Week award and the team's seventh in 2018.

==== Week 12: at Cincinnati Bengals ====
Week Twelve: Cleveland Browns at Cincinnati Bengals – Game summary

Quarter	1	2	3	4	Total
**Browns**	14	14	7	0	**35**
Bengals	0	7	7	6	**20**

at Paul Brown Stadium, Cincinnati, Ohio

- Date: November 25
- Game time: 1:00 pm. EST
- Game weather: Cloudy, 44 °F (7 °C)
- Game attendance: 56,122
- Referee: Jerome Boger
- TV announcers (CBS): Kevin Harlan, Rich Gannon, and Steve Tasker
- Recap, Gamebook

Game information

**First quarter**

- CLE – Nick Chubb 1-yard rush (Greg Joseph kick), 9:11. Browns 7–0. **Drive: 10 plays, 78 yards, 5:49.**
- CLE – Antonio Callaway 13-yard pass from Baker Mayfield (Greg Joseph kick), 1:37. Browns 14–0. **Drive: 4 plays, 56 yards, 1:24.**

**Second quarter**

- CLE – David Njoku 6-yard pass from Baker Mayfield (Greg Joseph kick), 9:18. Browns 21–0. **Drive: 12 plays, 96 yards, 5:47.**
- CLE – Nick Chubb 14-yard pass from Baker Mayfield (Greg Joseph kick), 2:25. Browns 28–0. **Drive: 11 plays, 59 yards, 6:44.**
- CIN – John Ross 2-yard pass from Andy Dalton (Randy Bullock kick), 0:32. Browns 28–7. **Drive: 8 plays, 75 yards, 1:53.**

**Third quarter**

- CLE – Darren Fells 6-yard pass from Baker Mayfield (Greg Joseph kick), 12:56. Browns 35–7. **Drive: 2 plays, 7 yards, 0:45.**
- CIN – Tyler Boyd 28-yard pass from Jeff Driskel (Randy Bullock kick), 4:56. Browns 35–14. **Drive: 9 plays, 75 yards, 5:39.**

**Fourth quarter**

- CIN – Jeff Driskel 2-yard rush (kick failed), 7:57. Browns 35–20. **Drive: 14 plays, 94 yards, 6:54.**

**Top passers**

- CLE – Baker Mayfield – 19/26, 258 yards, 4 TD
- CIN – Jeff Driskel – 17/29, 155 yards, TD

**Top rushers**

- CLE – Nick Chubb – 28 rushes, 84 yards, TD
- CIN – Joe Mixon – 14 rushes, 89 yards

**Top receivers**

- CLE – David Njoku – 5 receptions, 63 yards, TD
- CIN – Tyler Boyd – 7 receptions, 85 yards, TD

The Browns raced to a 28–0 lead late in the second quarter. They scored touchdowns on their first four drives with a Nick Chubb run and Baker Mayfield passes to Antonio Callaway, David Njoku, and Chubb. The Bengals responded with an Andy Dalton touchdown pass to John Ross to close the Browns' lead to 28–7 at halftime. Mayfield threw a fourth touchdown pass, this one to Darren Fells, to extend the Browns' lead to 35–7. The Bengals closed the gap to 35–20 with a touchdown pass and run by backup quarterback Jeff Driskel, who filled in for an injured Dalton, but the Browns held on for the win.

With the win, the Browns improved to 4–6–1. The Browns won consecutive games for the first time since 2014, snapped a seven-game losing streak to the Bengals, and ended their 25-game losing streak in away games, one short of tying the 2007–10 Detroit Lions record of 26 straight away losses. Mayfield was named the NFL Rookie of the Week for the fourth time this season. Mayfield was also named the NFL Offensive Rookie of the Month for November.

==== Week 13: at Houston Texans ====
Week Thirteen: Cleveland Browns at Houston Texans – Game summary

Quarter	1	2	3	4	Total
Browns	0	0	7	6	**13**
**Texans**	10	13	3	3	**29**

at NRG Stadium, Houston, Texas

- Date: December 2
- Game time: 1:00 pm. EST/12:00 pm. CST
- Game weather: None (retractable roof closed)
- Game attendance: 71,741
- Referee: Walt Coleman
- TV announcers (CBS): Greg Gumbel, Trent Green, Bruce Arians, and Melanie Collins
- Recap, Gamebook

Game information

**First quarter**

- HOU – Kaʻimi Fairbairn 35-yard field goal, 8:12. Texans 3–0. **Drive: 13 plays, 63 yards, 6:48.**
- HOU – Jordan Thomas 11-yard pass from Deshaun Watson (Kaʻimi Fairbairn kick), 0:38. Texans 10–0. **Drive: 10 plays, 82 yards, 5:38.**

**Second quarter**

- HOU – Zach Cunningham 38-yard interception return (Kaʻimi Fairbairn kick), 7:36. Texans 17–0.
- HOU – Kaʻimi Fairbairn 42-yard field goal, 3:24. Texans 20–0. **Drive: 7 plays, 27 yards, 3:13.**
- HOU – Kaʻimi Fairbairn 48-yard field goal, 0:05. Texans 23–0. **Drive: 10 plays, 50 yards, 1:39.**

**Third quarter**

- CLE – Nick Chubb 2-yard run (Greg Joseph kick), 9:42. Texans 23–7. **Drive: 9 plays, 75 yards, 5:21.**
- HOU – Kaʻimi Fairbairn 53-yard field goal, 5:31. Texans 26–7. **Drive: 9 plays, 40 yards, 4:13.**

**Fourth quarter**

- HOU – Kaʻimi Fairbairn 38-yard field goal, 5:50. Texans 29–7. **Drive: 8 plays, 44 yards, 3:59.**
- CLE – Rashard Higgins 17-yard pass from Baker Mayfield (pass failed), 2:58. Texans 29–13. **Drive: 9 plays, 75 yards, 2:48.**

**Top passers**

- CLE – Baker Mayfield – 29/43, 397 yards, TD, 3 INT
- HOU – Deshaun Watson – 22/31, 224 yards, TD

**Top rushers**

- CLE – Nick Chubb – 9 rushes, 31 yards, TD
- HOU – Lamar Miller – 19 rushes, 103 yards

**Top receivers**

- CLE – Jarvis Landry – 6 receptions, 103 yards
- HOU – DeAndre Hopkins – 7 receptions, 91 yards

The Texans built a 23–0 lead in the first half, on the strength of a Deshaun Watson touchdown pass, a Zach Cunningham interception return for a touchdown, and three field goals. The Browns got onto the scoreboard in the third quarter with a Nick Chubb touchdown run and added a Baker Mayfield touchdown pass to Rashard Higgins, but the Texans prevailed 29–13. Mayfield set a Browns rookie record with 398 passing yards, but was hurt by three interceptions.

With the loss, the Browns fell to 4–7–1.

==== Week 14: vs. Carolina Panthers ====
Week Fourteen: Carolina Panthers at Cleveland Browns – Game summary

Quarter	1	2	3	4	Total
Panthers	7	10	3	0	**20**
**Browns**	7	10	0	9	**26**

at FirstEnergy Stadium, Cleveland, Ohio

- Date: December 9
- Game time: 1:00 pm. EST
- Game weather: Sunny, 28 °F (−2 °C)
- Game attendance: 59,392
- Referee: Walt Anderson
- TV announcers (Fox): Dick Stockton, Mark Schlereth, Cris Carter, and Jennifer Hale
- Recap, Gamebook

Game information

**First quarter**

- CAR – Christian McCaffrey 4-yard rush (Chandler Catanzaro kick), 9:17. Panthers 7–0. **Drive: 10 plays, 65 yards, 5:43.**
- CLE – Jarvis Landry 3-yard rush (Greg Joseph kick), 7:41. Tied 7–7. **Drive: 3 plays, 75 yards, 1:36.**

**Second quarter**

- CAR – Christian McCaffrey 1-yard rush (Chandler Catanzaro kick), 14:13. Panthers 14–7. **Drive: 5 plays, 17 yards, 2:18.**
- CLE – Jarvis Landry 51-yard pass from Baker Mayfield (Greg Joseph kick), 8:27. Tied 14–14. **Drive: 8 plays, 75 yards, 5:46.**
- CAR – Chandler Catanzaro 30-yard field goal, 4:03. Panthers 17–14. **Drive: 8 plays, 70 yards, 4:24.**
- CLE – Greg Joseph 49-yard field goal, 0:59. Tied 17–17. **Drive: 8 plays, 44 yards, 3:04.**

**Third quarter**

- CAR – Chandler Catanzaro 34-yard field goal, 7:11. Panthers 20–17. **Drive: 10 plays, 38 yards, 4:26.**

**Fourth quarter**

- CLE – Nick Chubb 4-yard rush (kick failed), 13:05. Browns 23–20. **Drive: 6 plays, 75 yards, 3:31.**
- CLE – Greg Joseph 41-yard field goal, 8:46. Browns 26–20. **Drive: 6 plays, 40 yards, 3:55.**

**Top passers**

- CAR – Cam Newton – 26/42, 265 yards, INT
- CLE – Baker Mayfield – 18/22, 238 yards, TD

**Top rushers**

- CAR – Christian McCaffrey – 16 rushes, 63 yards, 2 TD
- CLE – Nick Chubb – 13 rushes, 66 yards, TD

**Top receivers**

- CAR – Curtis Samuel – 4 receptions, 80 yards
- CLE – Breshad Perriman – 2 receptions, 81 yards

The game went back and forth between the two teams. The Panthers scored two first-half touchdowns on Christian McCaffrey runs, while the Browns had two first half touchdowns on a Jarvis Landry run and a Landry catch. The teams exchanged field goals late in the second quarter to make the score 17–17 at halftime. After a Panthers field goal, Nick Chubb added a touchdown run early in the fourth quarter to take the lead for good, as the Browns won 26–20.

With the win, the Browns improved to 5–7–1 and secured their first winning record at home since the 2007 season. QB Baker Mayfield received his fifth NFL Rookie of the Week honor this season.

==== Week 15: at Denver Broncos ====
Week Fifteen: Cleveland Browns at Denver Broncos – Game summary

Quarter	1	2	3	4	Total
**Browns**	7	3	0	7	**17**
Broncos	7	3	3	3	**16**

at Broncos Stadium at Mile High, Denver, Colorado

- Date: December 15
- Game time: 8:20 pm. EST/6:20 p.m. MST
- Game weather: Partly cloudy, 46 °F (8 °C)
- Game attendance: 76,596
- Referee: Clay Martin
- TV announcers (NFLN): Mike Tirico, Kurt Warner, and Peter Schrager
- Recap, Gamebook

Game information

**First quarter**

- CLE – Breshad Perriman 31-yard pass from Baker Mayfield (Greg Joseph kick), 11:49. Browns 7–0. **Drive: 4 plays, 51 yards, 1:23.**
- DEN – Case Keenum 1-yard run (Brandon McManus kick), 3:18. Tied 7–7. **Drive: 13 plays, 88 yards, 6:37.**

**Second quarter**

- DEN – Brandon McManus 44-yard field goal, 8:16. Broncos 10–7. **Drive: 12 plays, 61 yards, 6:44.**
- CLE – Greg Joseph 40-yard field goal, 4:53. Tied 10–10. **Drive: 9 plays, 53 yards, 3:23.**

**Third quarter**

- DEN – Brandon McManus 42-yard field goal, 1:41. Broncos 13–10. **Drive: 8 plays, 36 yards, 4:08.**

**Fourth quarter**

- CLE – Antonio Callaway 2-yard pass from Baker Mayfield (Greg Joseph kick), 11:44. Browns 17–13. **Drive: 6 plays, 48 yards, 2:57.**
- DEN – Brandon McManus 29-yard field goal, 4:35. Browns 17–16. **Drive: 13 plays, 64 yards, 7:09.**

**Top passers**

- CLE – Baker Mayfield – 18/31, 188 yards, 2 TD, INT
- DEN – Case Keenum – 31/48, 257 yards, 2 INT

**Top rushers**

- CLE – Nick Chubb – 20 rushes, 100 yards
- DEN – Phillip Lindsay – 14 rushes, 24 yards

**Top receivers**

- CLE – Jarvis Landry – 3 receptions, 37 yards
- DEN – Tim Patrick – 5 receptions, 65 yards

The Browns traveled to Denver for a Saturday night game against the Broncos. Assistant defensive coordinator Blake Williams, son of interim head coach Gregg Williams, got his first play-calling duties in this game.

With the win, the Browns improved to 6–7–1. The win ended an 11-game losing streak to the Broncos that dated back to 1990. However, the following day, the Steelers defeated the Patriots to improve to 8–5–1 and mathematically eliminated the Browns from AFC North title contention. This will be the Browns' 26th consecutive season without a division title, the longest active streak in the NFL. A Tennessee Titans win over the Washington Redskins mathematically eliminated the Browns from playoff contention.

==== Week 16: vs. Cincinnati Bengals ====
Week Sixteen: Cincinnati Bengals at Cleveland Browns – Game summary

Quarter	1	2	3	4	Total
Bengals	0	0	0	18	**18**
**Browns**	0	16	7	3	**26**

at FirstEnergy Stadium, Cleveland, Ohio

- Date: December 23
- Game time: 1:00 pm. EST
- Game weather: Cloudy, 37 °F (3 °C)
- Game attendance: 67,431
- Referee: Tony Corrente
- TV announcers (CBS): Spero Dedes and Adam Archuleta
- Recap, Gamebook

Game information

**First quarter**

- No scoring plays.

**Second quarter**

- CLE – David Njoku 3-yard pass from Baker Mayfield (Greg Joseph kick), 10:20. Browns 7–0. **Drive: 13 plays, 74 yards, 7:23.**
- CLE – Darren Fells 1-yard pass from Baker Mayfield (PAT failed), 7:33 Browns 13–0. **Drive: 3 plays, 70 yards, 1:33.**
- CLE – Greg Joseph 37-yard field goal, 0:10 Browns 16–0. **Drive: 10 plays, 61 yards, 4:45.**

**Third quarter**

- CLE – Rashard Higgins 17-yard pass from Baker Mayfield (Greg Joseph kick), 4:53 Browns 23–0. **Drive: 9 plays, 87 yards, 4:58.**

**Fourth quarter**

- CIN – Randy Bullock 51-yard field goal, 14:55 Browns 23–3. **Drive: 10 plays, 36 yards, 4:58.**
- CLE – Greg Joseph 31-yard field goal, 7:26 Browns 26–3. **Drive: 14 plays, 62 yards, 7:29.**
- CIN – C. J. Uzomah 14-yard pass from Jeff Driskel (Randy Bullock kick), 4:56 Browns 26–10. **Drive: 6 plays, 75 yards, 2:30.**
- CIN – John Ross 3-yard pass from Jeff Driskel (Jeff Driskel pass to Cody Core), 2:56 Browns 26–18. **Drive: 3 plays, 23 yards, 0:57.**

**Top passers**

- CIN – Jeff Driskel – 13/19, 133 yards, 2 TD
- CLE – Baker Mayfield – 27/37, 284 yards, 3 TD

**Top rushers**

- CIN – Joe Mixon – 17 rushes, 68 yards
- CLE – Nick Chubb – 19 rushes, 112 yards

**Top receivers**

- CIN – C. J. Uzomah – 4 receptions, 49 yards, TD
- CLE – Rashard Higgins – 6 receptions, 60 yards, TD

On December 22, the day before the Browns' Week 16 contest, the Tennessee Titans won their Week 16 game to improve to 9–6 and mathematically eliminate the Browns from postseason contention for the 16th consecutive season. Despite being eliminated, the Browns looked to finish their season on a high note with two division wins to end the season.

The Browns hosted the Bengals and former head coach Hue Jackson, who was hired as an assistant with the Bengals. Baker Mayfield threw three touchdown passes and Nick Chubb added 112 rushing yards to give the Browns a 26–3 lead early in the fourth quarter. Cincinnati scored a pair of late touchdowns to make it a one-possession game, but the Browns held on for the 26–18 win.

With the win, the Browns improved to 7–7–1 and finished with a 5–2–1 record at home, their best home record since 2007, when they went 7–1 at home. It was their first three-game winning streak since 2014 and their first season sweep of the Bengals since 2002. They also secured a winning record within the AFC North for the first time since the division was formed in 2002.

==== Week 17: at Baltimore Ravens ====
Week Seventeen: Cleveland Browns at Baltimore Ravens – Game summary

Quarter	1	2	3	4	Total
Browns	7	0	7	10	**24**
**Ravens**	10	10	3	3	**26**

at M&T Bank Stadium, Baltimore, Maryland

- Date: December 30
- Game time: 4:25 pm. EST
- Game weather: Partly cloudy, 48 °F (9 °C)
- Game attendance: 70,925
- Referee: Shawn Smith
- TV announcers (CBS): Jim Nantz, Tony Romo, Tracy Wolfson, and Gene Steratore
- Recap, Gamebook

Game information

**First quarter**

- BAL – Justin Tucker 38-yard field goal, 9:27. Ravens 3–0. **Drive: 9 plays, 41 yards, 3:27.**
- CLE – Breshad Perriman 28-yard pass from Baker Mayfield (Greg Joseph kick), 8:22. Browns 7–3. **Drive: 4 plays, 75 yards, 1:05.**
- BAL – Lamar Jackson 25-yard rush (Justin Tucker kick), 4:46. Ravens 10–7. **Drive: 7 plays, 69 yards, 3:36.**

**Second quarter**

- BAL – Lamar Jackson 8-yard rush (Justin Tucker kick), 14:54. Ravens 17–7. **Drive: 6 plays, 77 yards, 2:54.**
- BAL – Justin Tucker 35-yard field goal, 6:11. Ravens 20–7. **Drive: 8 plays, 64 yards, 6:12.**

**Third quarter**

- CLE – Jarvis Landry 48-yard pass from Baker Mayfield (Greg Joseph kick), 12:27. Ravens 20–14. **Drive: 1 plays, 48 yards, 0:08.**
- BAL – Justin Tucker 44-yard field goal, 7:02. Ravens 23–14. **Drive: 12 plays, 49 yards, 5:25.**

**Fourth quarter**

- CLE – Greg Joseph 35-yard field goal, 13:45. Ravens 23–17. **Drive: 9 plays, 60 yards, 4:08.**
- BAL – Justin Tucker 23-yard field goal, 7:20. Ravens 26–17. **Drive: 12 plays, 78 yards, 6:25.**
- CLE – Antonio Callaway 1-yard pass from Baker Mayfield (Greg Joseph kick), 3:24. Ravens 26–24. **Drive: 9 plays, 75 yards, 3:56.**

**Top passers**

- CLE – Baker Mayfield – 23/42, 376 yards, 3 TD, 3 INT
- BAL – Lamar Jackson – 14/24, 179 yards

**Top rushers**

- CLE – Nick Chubb – 9 rushes, 24 yards
- BAL – Kenneth Dixon – 12 rushes, 117 yards

**Top receivers**

- CLE – Jarvis Landry – 5 receptions, 102 yards, TD
- BAL – Mark Andrews – 4 receptions, 54 yards

The Browns entered the final game of the season attempting to play the role of spoiler, as the Ravens needed a win – or a Steelers loss – to clinch the AFC North title.

The Ravens built a 20–7 halftime lead on the strength of two touchdown runs by fellow rookie QB Lamar Jackson. The Browns' score was on a Baker Mayfield 28-yard pass to former Raven Breshad Perriman. While the Ravens maintained their lead throughout the game, Mayfield added two touchdown passes in the second half, including a strike to Antonio Callaway to cut the Ravens' lead to 26–24 with 3:24 remaining. The Browns had one more chance, but Mayfield threw an interception to C.J. Mosley to seal the game.

With the loss, the Browns finished the season 7–8–1, marking their 11th consecutive losing season, which is a franchise record and the longest active streak in the NFL. The Browns finished 2–6 in away games. Mayfield won his seventh Rookie of the Week award.

=== Standings ===
==== Division ====
AFC North
	W	L	T	PCT	DIV	CONF	PF	PA	STK
^{(4)} Baltimore Ravens	10	6	0	.625	3–3	8–4	389	287	W3
Pittsburgh Steelers	9	6	1	.594	4–1–1	6–5–1	428	360	W1
Cleveland Browns	7	8	1	.469	3–2–1	5–6–1	359	392	L1
Cincinnati Bengals	6	10	0	.375	1–5	4–8	368	455	L2

==== Conference ====
AFC
#	Team	Division	W	L	T	PCT	DIV	CONF	SOS	SOV	STK
**Division leaders**
1 (Note: Kansas City finished ahead of LA Chargers in the AFC West based on division record, claiming the No. 1 seed.)	Kansas City Chiefs	West	12	4	0	.750	5–1	10–2	.480	.401	W1
2 (Note: New England claimed the No. 2 seed over Houston based on head-to-head victory.)	New England Patriots	East	11	5	0	.688	5–1	8–4	.482	.494	W2
3	Houston Texans	South	11	5	0	.688	4–2	9–3	.471	.435	W1
4	Baltimore Ravens	North	10	6	0	.625	3–3	8–4	.496	.450	W3
**Wild Cards**
5	Los Angeles Chargers	West	12	4	0	.750	4–2	9–3	.477	.422	W1
6	Indianapolis Colts	South	10	6	0	.625	4–2	7–5	.465	.456	W4
**Did not qualify for the postseason**
7	Pittsburgh Steelers	North	9	6	1	.594	4–1–1	6–5–1	.504	.448	W1
8	Tennessee Titans	South	9	7	0	.563	3–3	5–7	.520	.465	L1
9	Cleveland Browns	North	7	8	1	.469	3–2–1	5–6–1	.516	.411	L1
10	Miami Dolphins	East	7	9	0	.438	4–2	6–6	.469	.446	L3
11 (Note: Denver finished ahead of Cincinnati and Buffalo based on strength of victory. Cincinnati finished ahead of Buffalo based on record vs. common opponents. Cincinnati's cumulative record against Baltimore, Indianapolis, the Los Angeles Chargers and Miami was 3–2, compared to Buffalo's 1–4 cumulative record against the same four teams.)	Denver Broncos	West	6	10	0	.375	2–4	4–8	.523	.464	L4
12	Cincinnati Bengals	North	6	10	0	.375	1–5	4–8	.535	.448	L2
13	Buffalo Bills	East	6	10	0	.375	2–4	4–8	.523	.411	W1
14	Jacksonville Jaguars	South	5	11	0	.313	1–5	4–8	.549	.463	L1
15 (Note: NY Jets finished ahead of Oakland based on strength of victory.)	New York Jets	East	4	12	0	.250	1–5	3–9	.506	.438	L3
16	Oakland Raiders	West	4	12	0	.250	1–5	3–9	.547	.406	L1
**Tiebreakers** (Note: When breaking ties for three or more teams under the NFL's rules, they are first broken within divisions, then comparing only the highest ranked remaining team from each division.)

=== Team leaders ===
Category	Player(s)	Value
Passing yards	Baker Mayfield	3,725
Passing touchdowns	Baker Mayfield	27
Rushing yards	Nick Chubb	996
Rushing touchdowns	Nick Chubb	8
Receptions	Jarvis Landry	81
Receiving yards	Jarvis Landry	976
Receiving touchdowns	Antonio Callaway	5
Points	Greg Joseph	76
Kickoff return yards	Jabrill Peppers	408
Punt return yards	Jabrill Peppers	219
Tackles	Jamie Collins Sr.	104
Sacks	Myles Garrett	13.5
Forced fumbles	Myles Garrett	3
Interceptions	Damarious Randall	4
Pass deflections	Denzel Ward	11

== Individual honors ==
Four Browns players, G Joel Bitonio, DE Myles Garrett, WR Jarvis Landry, and CB Denzel Ward, were named to the AFC Roster for the 2019 Pro Bowl. Garrett was voted as a starter and Ward as a reserve. Bitonio and Landry were named as alternates and later named to the AFC roster to replace injured players. This marked Landry's fourth consecutive and fourth overall Pro Bowl appearance, and the first appearance for the three other players.

In addition, RB Nick Chubb and P Britton Colquitt were named second alternates and QB Baker Mayfield and G Kevin Zeitler were named fourth alternates at their respective positions.

Bitonio and Garrett were also named to the All-Pro second team

Chubb and Mayfield were nominated for the NFL Offensive Rookie of the Year award, however both fell short to the eventual winner, New York Giants RB Saquon Barkley.
