= Richard Leonard (Canadian football) =

American gridiron football player (born 1991)

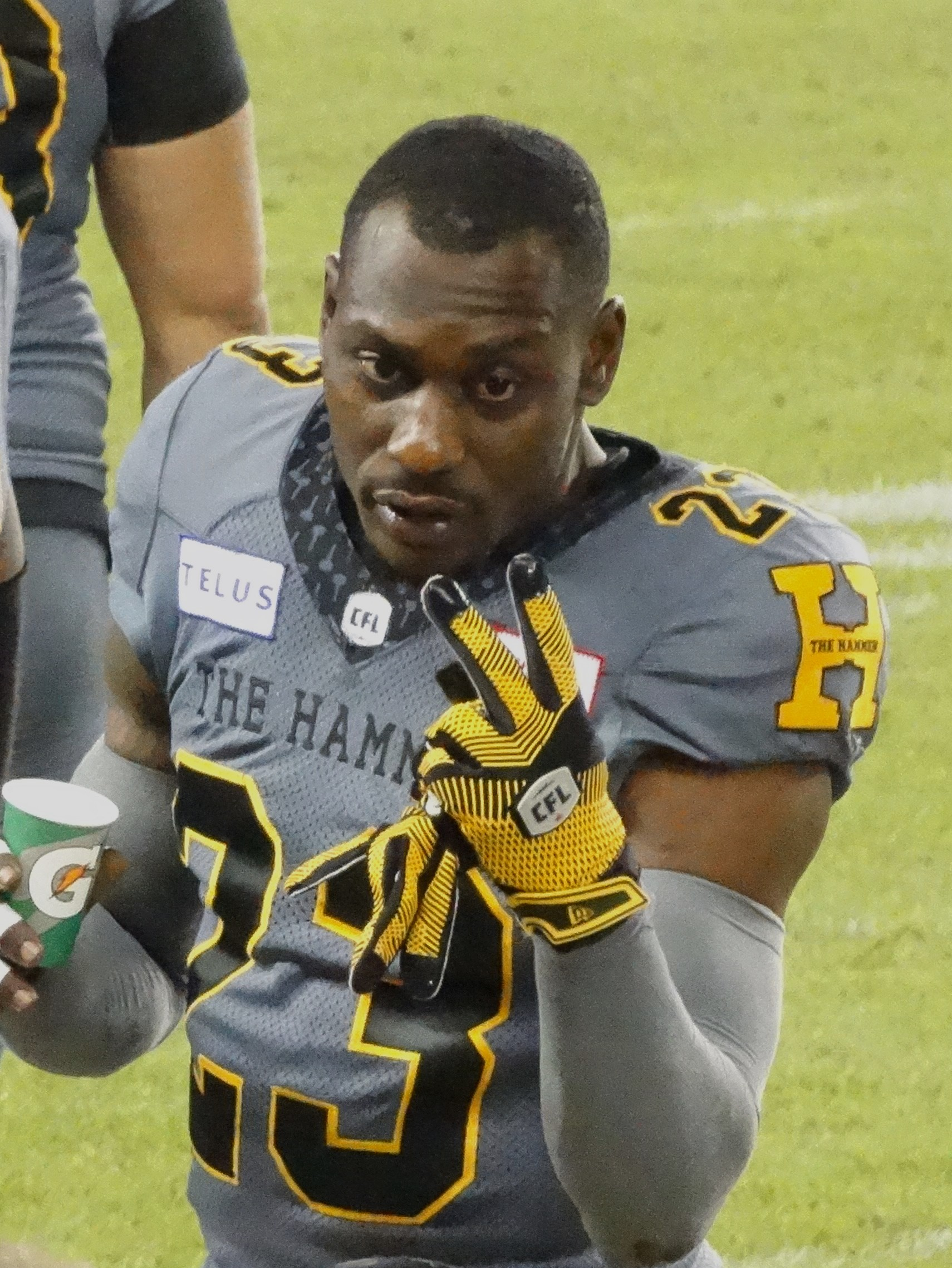
- Leonard with the Hamilton Tiger-Cats in 2024

Profile
- Position: Defensive back

Personal information
- Born: September 2, 1991 (age 35); Miami, Florida, U.S.
- Listed height: 5 ft 8 in (1.73 m)
- Listed weight: 173 lb (78 kg)

Career information
- High school: Miami Killian
- College: FIU
- NFL draft: 2016: undrafted

Career history
- Houston Texans (2016)*; Hamilton Tiger-Cats (2017–2019); Calgary Stampeders (2020–2021); Hamilton Tiger-Cats (2022–2024)
- * Offseason or practice squad member only

Awards and highlights
- CFL All-Star (2019); 3× CFL East All-Star (2017, 2019, 2022); First-team All-Conference USA Selection
- Stats at CFL.ca

Richard Leonard (born September 2, 1991) is an American professional football defensive back. He played college football at FIU. He signed as an undrafted free agent with the Houston Texans in 2016.

== Early life ==
Leonard attended Miami Killian High School, where he holds records in football and track and field.

== College career ==
Leonard committed to FIU on September 30, 2009. With the Panthers, he starred as both a cornerback and kick returner. He was named a first-team All-Conference USA selection at cornerback and punt returner.

== Professional career ==
Pre-draft measurables
Height	Weight	40-yard dash	20-yard shuttle	Three-cone drill	Vertical jump	Broad jump	Bench press
5 ft 8 in (1.73 m)	175 lb (79 kg)	4.39 s	4.33 s	6.92 s	35 in (0.89 m)	10 ft 0 in (3.05 m)	18 reps
All values from Pro Day

=== Houston Texans ===
Leonard was not selected in the 2016 NFL draft and signed a contract as an undrafted free agent with the Houston Texans on May 5, 2016. Leonard would suffer a torn hamstring and was waived on July 20. The Texans would release Leonard with an injury settlement on August 11.

=== Hamilton Tiger Cats (first stint) ===
On May 25, 2017, Leonard signed with the Hamilton Tiger-Cats of the Canadian Football League. Leonard would go on to have an impressive rookie season with the Tiger Cats, recording 72 tackles, 7 interceptions and returned a blocked field goal for a touchdown in his first game against the Toronto Argonauts. Leonard was named an East Division All-Star for 2017. He started 18 games at cornerback for the Tiger-Cats. He was named the team's Most Outstanding Rookie. Overall, he played in three seasons for the Tiger-Cats and appeared in 49 regular season games, recording 178 defensive tackles, 31 pass knockdowns, and 12 interceptions.

=== Calgary Stampeders ===
Upon becoming a free agent on February 11, 2020, Leonard signed with the Calgary Stampeders. He re-signed with the team on December 14. Leonard became a free agent upon the expiry of his contract on February 8, 2022.

=== Hamilton Tiger-Cats (second stint) ===
On February 8, 2022, it was announced that Leonard had signed with the Tiger-Cats.

== Personal ==
Leonard has a cousin, Jeremiah McKinnon, who currently plays cornerback for the New York Giants.
