= Adam Henry (American football) =

American football player and coach (born 1972)

Adam C. Henry, Ed.D.
Pittsburgh Steelers
- Title: Wide receivers coach

Personal information
- Born: April 27, 1972 (age 54); Beaumont, Texas, U.S.

Career information
- Position: Wide receiver
- High school: Monsignor Kelly Catholic High School
- College: McNeese State
- NFL draft: 1994: undrafted

Career history

Playing
- New Orleans Saints (1994–1996)*
- * Offseason or practice squad member only

Coaching
- McNeese State (1997–2006); Wide receivers coach (1997–2005); Assistant head coach & offensive coordinator (2006); Oakland Raiders (2007–2011); Offensive quality control coach (2007–2008); Tight ends coach (2009–2011); LSU (2012–2014) Passing game coordinator & wide receivers coach; San Francisco 49ers (2015) Wide receivers coach; New York Giants (2016–2017) Wide receivers coach; Cleveland Browns (2018–2019) Wide receivers coach; Dallas Cowboys (2020–2021) Wide receivers coach; Indiana (2022) Co-offensive coordinator & wide receivers coach; Buffalo Bills (2023–2025) Wide receivers coach; Pittsburgh Steelers (2026–present) Wide receivers coach

Adam Henry (born April 27, 1972) is an American football coach and former player who is the wide receivers coach for the Pittsburgh Steelers of the National Football League (NFL). Henry has previously served as wide receivers coach for the Indiana Hoosiers, LSU, San Francisco 49ers, Cleveland Browns, Dallas Cowboys, New York Giants, and Buffalo Bills. He also served as tight ends coach for the Oakland Raiders. He has coached Pro Bowlers Odell Beckham Jr., Anquan Boldin, Amari Cooper, Stefon Diggs, CeeDee Lamb, Jarvis Landry, and Zach Miller.

== College career ==
Henry was a wide receiver at McNeese State from 1990 to 1993, earning All-Southland Conference honors as a senior. He finished his career with 93 receptions for 1,690 yards and 16 touchdowns, all of which remain in the top-10 in school history. He was enshrined in the McNeese Sports Hall of Fame in 2017.

== Professional career ==
Following his career at McNeese State, Henry signed a free agent contract with the New Orleans Saints in 1994. He spent training camp and the preseason with the Saints in 1995 and 1996. In a 1995 preseason game, he caught a 26-yard touchdown pass from Tommy Hodson against the Seahawks.

== Coaching career ==
=== McNeese State ===
Henry joined McNeese State in 1997 as the wide receivers coach. He served as wide receivers coach for nine seasons before being promoted to assistant head coach and offensive coordinator in 2006. As the wide receivers coach, Henry helped develop Jermaine Martin, who finished his career as the school's all-time leader in receptions (160) and receiving yards (2,646), as well as the 2003 Southland Conference Player of the Year, B.J. Sams. During his time with McNeese, the Cowboys won 4 Southland Conference Championships and went to their only two Division I-AA Championship games, losing both including a 4th quarter loss to Youngstown State late in the 4th quarter.

=== Oakland Raiders ===
Henry would join the Oakland Raiders in 2007. He spent his first two years with the Raiders as an offensive quality control assistant. Henry was promoted to tight ends coach by head coach Tom Cable in 2009. Henry helped accelerate the development of Zach Miller, who became the first tight end in franchise history to lead the team in receiving for three straight years. Miller set career highs in receptions (66) and receiving yards (805) in 2009, and was selected to the Pro Bowl for the first time the following season, in 2010. In 2011, Henry was retained by new head coach Hue Jackson. However, he was not retained following Jackson's dismissal as head coach.

=== LSU ===
Henry would join the LSU Tigers football team in 2012. In his first year with the Tigers, Henry's receiving unit featured four underclassmen and was led by sophomores Odell Beckham Jr. and Jarvis Landry, who combined for 99 receptions for 1,286 yards and seven touchdowns. In 2013, Beckham and Landry became the first pair of receivers in school history to finish with more than 1,000 yards in the same season. Landry led the Tigers with 77 receptions for 1,193 yards and 10 touchdowns, while Beckham caught 59 passes for 1,152 yards and eight touchdowns. Beckham earned first-team All-America honors as a kick returner and an all-purpose player in 2013, and was the recipient of the 2013 Hornung Award as college football's most versatile player. In 2014, redshirt sophomore Travin Dural finished the season ranked sixth in the SEC in receiving yards (758) and tied for seventh in receiving touchdowns (seven). Dural's 20.5 yards per reception average was best in the conference among players with at least 35 catches.

=== San Francisco 49ers ===
Henry joined the San Francisco 49ers as the wide receivers coach in 2015.

=== New York Giants ===
In the wake of an end of the season meltdown by Beckham, the New York Giants hired Henry to join the team as the wide receivers coach in 2016 where he was reunited with Beckham. That season Henry coached in his first playoff game, a 38–13 loss to the Packers in the wild-card round. Also, Beckham made a career-high 101 catches for 1,367 yards and 10 TDs, second in Giants history, and his yardage was third. Sterling Shepard, meanwhile, was second among NFL rookies with 65 catches.

=== Cleveland Browns ===
Henry signed a 3-year deal with the Cleveland Browns as their new wide receivers coach in 2018, reuniting him with Jarvis Landry and, the next season, with Odell Beckham Jr. In 2019 Landry and Beckham became the first wideouts in Browns history to each record over 1,000 receiving yards in the same season.

=== Dallas Cowboys ===
Henry left the Browns to join the Dallas Cowboys as their new wide receivers coach. The move came soon after the Cowboys hired former Green Bay Packers head coach, Mike McCarthy. In 2020, the Cowboys finished first in the NFC in receptions and CeeDee Lamb set a rookie record for catches and Cooper became just the 4th Cowboy to get 90 receptions in a season. In 2021 he coached CeeDee Lamb, who had over 1,000 yards receiving and Henry coached in his second playoff game, a 23–17 loss to the 49ers in the Wild Card round.

=== Indiana Hoosiers ===
On March 18, 2022, Tom Allen hired Henry as the Hoosiers' co-offensive coordinator (with Walt Bell) and wide receivers coach.

=== Buffalo Bills ===
On February 15, 2023, Henry left Indiana to be the Buffalo Bills wide receivers coach, taking over for Chad Hall, who left for the same position with the Jacksonville Jaguars. The move was thought to once again reunite him with Beckham whom the Bills were trying to sign. In 2023, Henry coached for his first division champion as the Bills won the AFC East; and coached in his first playoff victory as the Bills beat Pittsburgh in the Wild Card Round. The next week they were upset by the Kansas City Chiefs 27–24 in the Divisional Playoffs.

=== Pittsburgh Steelers ===
On January 28, 2026, Henry left the Bills to be the wide receivers coach for the Pittsburgh Steelers under new head coach Mike McCarthy.

== Personal life ==
Henry is a native of Beaumont, Texas. He has three children, Darian, Kynidee, and Ava. Henry is a member of Epsilon Phi chapter of Kappa Alpha Psi. Henry is married to Zita Henry, D.D.S. (Fayetteville, NC).
