= Brady Sheldon =

American gridiron football player (born 1993)

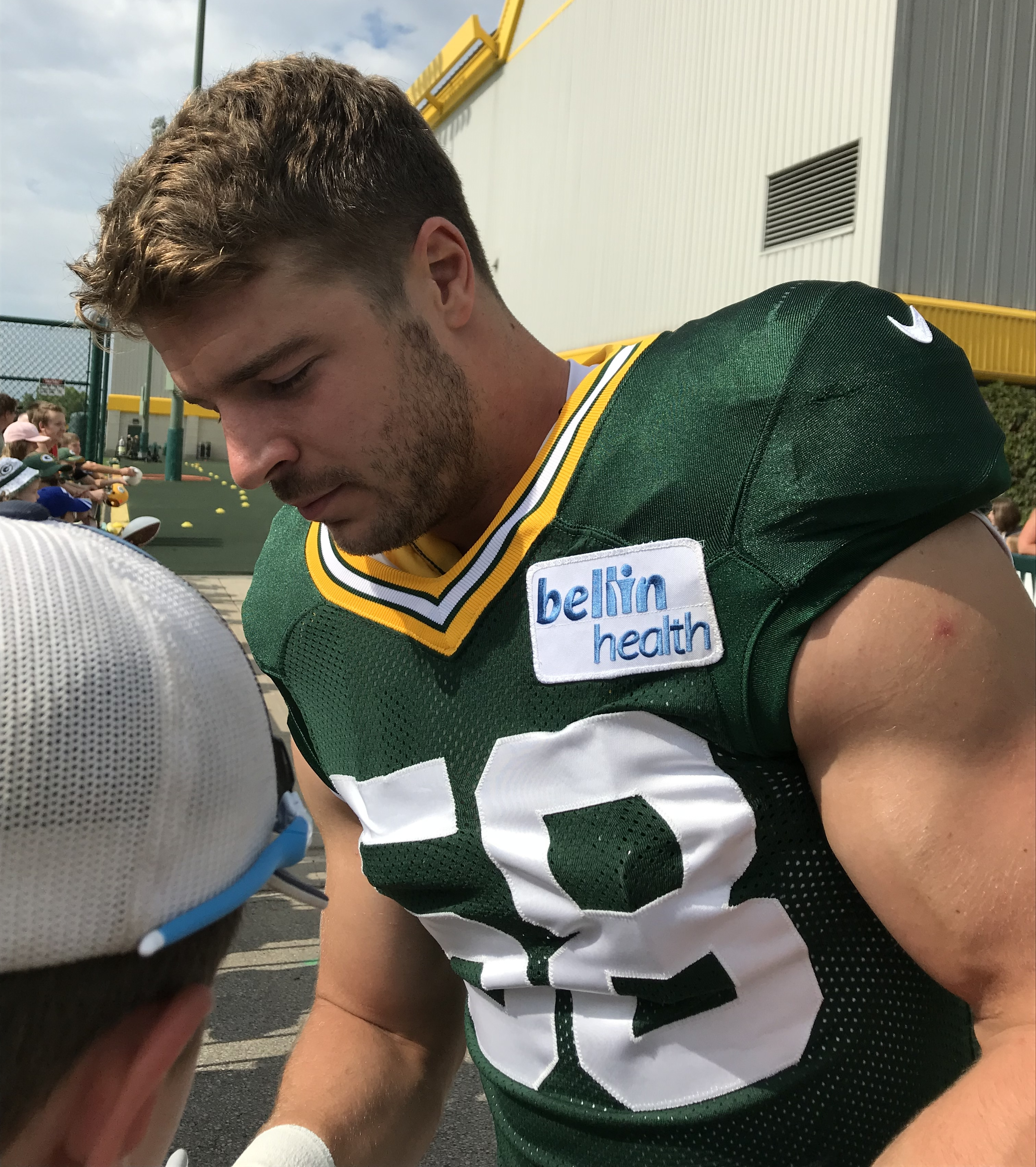
- Sheldon at the Green Bay Packers' 2019 training camp

Profile
- Position: Linebacker

Personal information
- Born: February 23, 1993 (age 33); Novi, Michigan, U.S.
- Listed height: 6 ft 5 in (1.96 m)
- Listed weight: 230 lb (104 kg)

Career information
- High school: Novi (Novi, Michigan)
- College: Ferris State
- NFL draft: 2017: undrafted

Career history
- Oakland Raiders (2017); Cleveland Browns (2018)*; Green Bay Packers (2018–2019)*; Cincinnati Bengals (2019); New York Jets (2020); Toronto Argonauts (2021); Edmonton Elks (2022)
- * Offseason or practice squad member only

Career NFL statistics
- Games played: 5
- Total tackles: 1
- Stats at Pro Football Reference
- Stats at CFL.ca

Brady Sheldon (born February 23, 1993) is an American professional gridiron football linebacker who is a free agent. He was most recently a member of the Edmonton Elks of the Canadian Football League (CFL). He played college football at Ferris State.

== Professional career ==
=== Oakland Raiders ===
Sheldon signed with the Oakland Raiders as an undrafted free agent on July 14, 2017. He was waived by the Raiders on September 2, 2017. He was re-signed to the practice squad on November 21, 2017. He was promoted to the active roster on December 22, 2017.

On June 12, 2018, Sheldon was waived by the Raiders.

=== Cleveland Browns ===
On June 13, 2018, Sheldon was claimed off waivers by the Cleveland Browns.

On September 1, 2018, Sheldon was waived by the Browns and was re-signed to the practice squad. He was released on October 30, 2018.

=== Green Bay Packers ===
On November 6, 2018, Sheldon was signed to the Green Bay Packers practice squad. He signed a reserve/future contract with the Packers on December 31, 2018.

On August 31, 2019, Sheldon was waived by the Packers and was signed to the practice squad the next day. He was released on October 1.

=== Cincinnati Bengals ===
On November 5, 2019, Sheldon was signed to the Cincinnati Bengals practice squad. He was promoted to the active roster on December 17, 2019. He was waived on September 3, 2020.

=== New York Jets ===
On December 8, 2020, Sheldon signed with the practice squad of the New York Jets. He was elevated to the active roster on December 26 and January 2, 2021, for the team's weeks 16 and 17 games against the Cleveland Browns and New England Patriots, and reverted to the practice squad after each game. His practice squad contract with the team expired after the season on January 11, 2021.

=== Toronto Argonauts ===
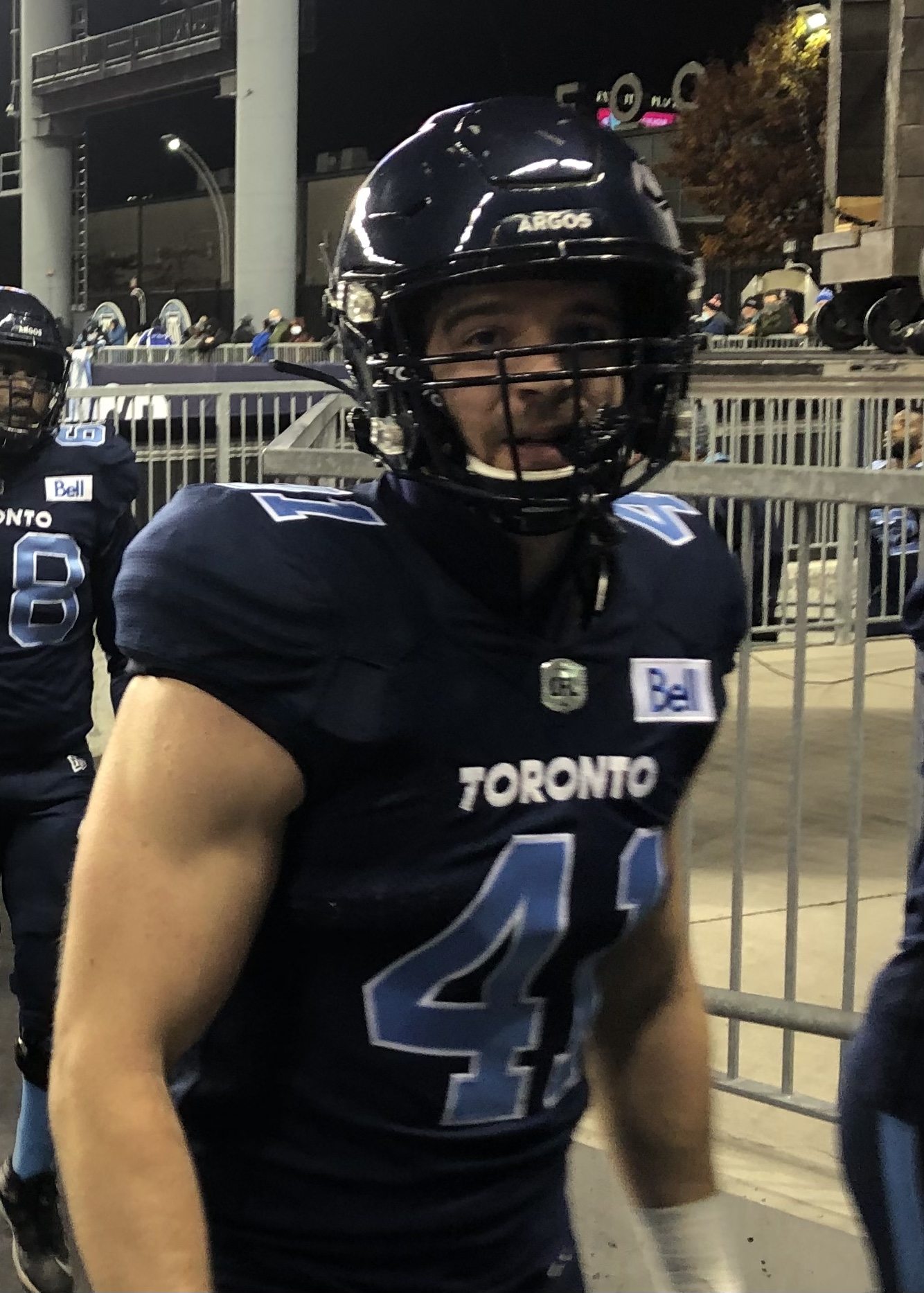
Sheldon with the Toronto Argonauts in 2021

On November 9, 2021, it was announced that Sheldon had signed with the Toronto Argonauts. He played in one regular season game, on November 16, 2021, where he had three defensive tackles. He spent part of 2022 training camp with the team, but was released after the first pre-season game on May 29, 2022.

=== Edmonton Elks ===
On May 31, 2022, The Edmonton Elks signed Sheldon. He became a starter by Week 2 of the regular season. However, he was released on December 1, 2022 after tearing his ACL and MCL.
