= Desmond Harrison (American football) =

American football player (born 1993)

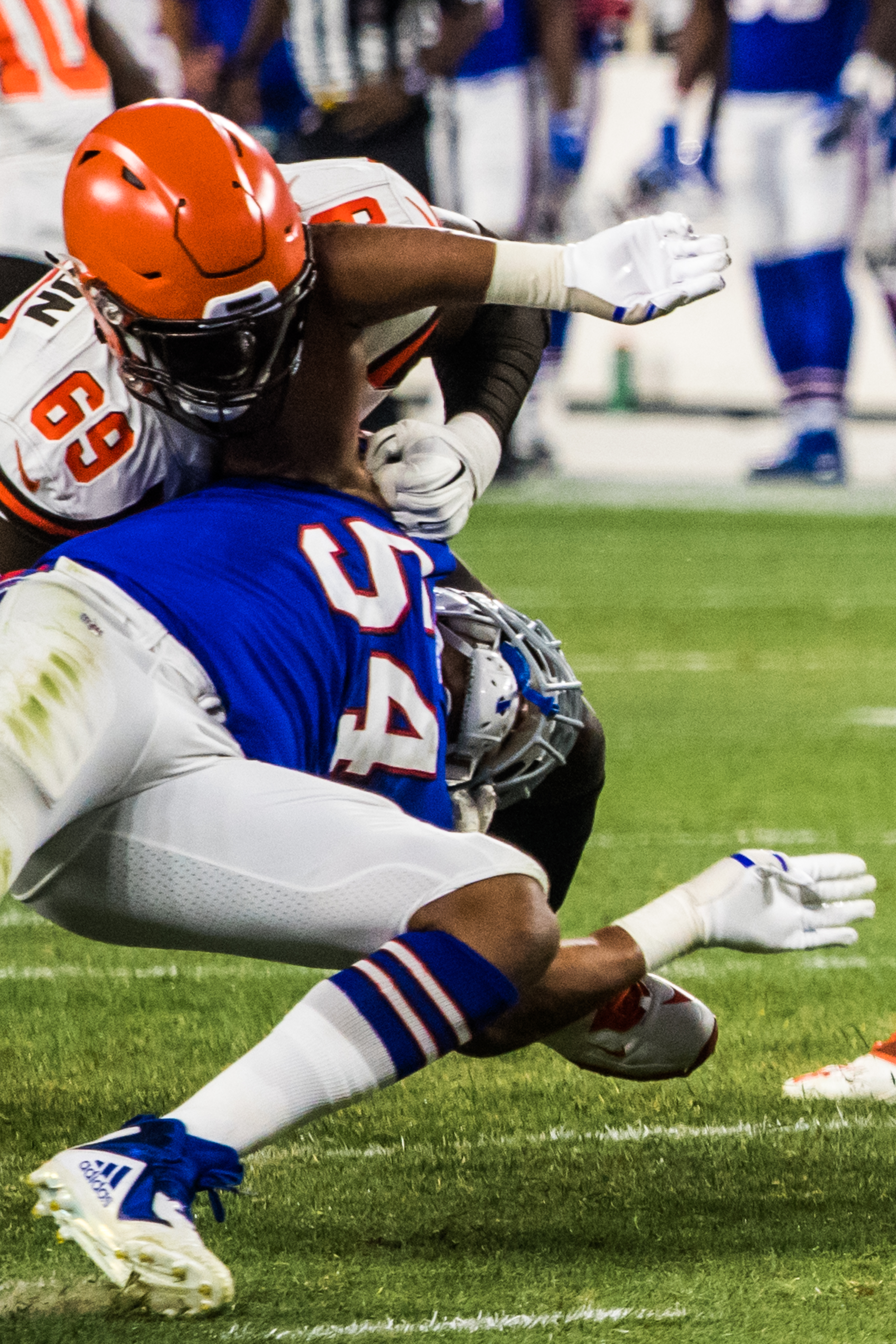
- Harrison (No. 69) with the Browns in 2018

No. 69
- Position: Offensive tackle

Personal information
- Born: October 8, 1993 (age 33); Houston, Texas, U.S.
- Listed height: 6 ft 6 in (1.98 m)
- Listed weight: 295 lb (134 kg)

Career information
- High school: Oak Ridge Military Academy (Oak Ridge, North Carolina)
- College: West Georgia
- NFL draft: 2018: undrafted

Career history
- Cleveland Browns (2018); Arizona Cardinals (2019)*
- * Offseason or practice squad member only

Awards and highlights
- First-team All-American Community College (2012); First-team All-Gulf South (2017)

Career NFL statistics
- Games played: 8
- Games started: 8
- Stats at Pro Football Reference

Desmond Harrison (born October 8, 1993) is a former American football offensive tackle who played one season with the Cleveland Browns, during which he played in 8 games. He also went to camp with the Arizona Cardinals. He played college football at Contra Costa College and later West Georgia; and in between he was with the Texas Longhorns where he lettered but did not play.

== College career ==
Following his time at Contra Costa College, Harrison was seen as a top recruit after being named to the All-American Community College First-team. Harrison joined the Texas Longhorns for his junior year, but was deemed academically ineligible to play before the season started. This was because Harrison had taken an online course at Brigham Young University during his time at Contra Costa, and BYU's school policy stated that student-athletes from other universities could not receive credit from online courses. The NCAA later cleared Harrison to play. Harrison later missed the entire 2014 season after he was suspended a total of 3 times. He was able to use this as a redshirt year, but he was not able to rejoin the program for the 2015 season. After leaving Texas, he spent two years away from football, and later joined the West Georgia Wolves for the 2017 season. Following his senior season at West Georgia, Harrison was invited to the 2018 Senior Bowl.

== Professional career ==
Pre-draft measurables
Height	Weight	Arm length	Hand span	40-yard dash	10-yard split	20-yard split	20-yard shuttle	Three-cone drill	Vertical jump	Broad jump
6 ft 6 in (1.98 m)	292 lb (132 kg)	34 in (0.86 m)	10 3/8 in (0.26 m)	4.90 s	1.72 s	2.85 s	4.79 s	7.64 s	30 in (0.76 m)	8 ft 2 in (2.49 m)
All values from NFL draft

At the 2018 NFL combine, Harrison garnered attention after running the 40-yard dash in 4.9 seconds, the 2nd fastest of any offensive line prospect at the combine. He also recorded an unofficial time of 4.75 seconds. Despite a strong combine, he was not selected in the 2018 NFL draft.

=== Cleveland Browns ===
Harrison signed with the Cleveland Browns as an undrafted free agent on May 4, 2018. After an impressive rookie training camp, the Browns named Harrison their starting left tackle on September 7, 2018. Following the Browns' firing of head coach Hue Jackson on October 29, 2018, Harrison was benched by interim head coach Gregg Williams in favor of Greg Robinson.

On June 5, 2019, Harrison was waived by the Browns after a missed flight caused him to miss the first day of Cleveland's mandatory mini-camp, deemed to be "one too many missteps" for Harrison.

=== Arizona Cardinals ===
On June 6, 2019, Harrison was claimed by the Arizona Cardinals, the day after he was waived by the Browns. A month later on July 17, the Cardinals released Harrison following news of assault allegations and a felony arrest warrant in North Carolina.

== Personal life ==
In July 2019, a warrant was issued for the arrest of Harrison, who was charged with assault on a person by strangulation and assault on a woman by a man. He turned himself in to police in Greensboro, North Carolina on July 19, 2019, and was held at the Guilford County Jail. He was suspended for the first six games of the 2021 NFL season by the league on March 10, 2021.
