= Jeremiah McKinnon =

American football player (born 1993)

No. 37, 33, 38, 31, 47, 36, 25
- Position: Cornerback

Personal information
- Born: June 29, 1993 (age 33); Miami, Florida, U.S.
- Listed height: 5 ft 10 in (1.78 m)
- Listed weight: 197 lb (89 kg)

Career information
- High school: Miami Southridge
- College: FIU
- NFL draft: 2016: undrafted

Career history
- Dallas Cowboys (2016)*; Tennessee Titans (2016)*; Dallas Cowboys (2017)*; Washington Redskins (2017)*; New York Giants (2017–2018)*; Cleveland Browns (2018); Philadelphia Eagles (2018–2019)*; New York Guardians (2020)
- * Offseason or practice squad member only

Career NFL statistics
- Games played: 1
- Total tackles: 1
- Forced fumbles: 0
- Fumble recoveries: 0
- Interceptions: 0
- Stats at Pro Football Reference

Jeremiah McKinnon (born June 29, 1993) is an American former professional football player who was a cornerback in the National Football League (NFL) for the Tennessee Titans, New York Giants, Cleveland Browns and Philadelphia Eagles. He also was a member of the New York Guardians in the XFL. He played college football for the FIU Panthers.

== Early life ==
McKinnon attended Miami Southridge, where he played as a quarterback, wide receiver and kick returner.

As a senior, he posted over 1,000 all-purpose yards and 7 touchdowns, while contributing to the team winning the district championship and reaching the 2011 Class 8A Regional Finals. He received Miami Herald Class 8A-6A All-Dade and second-team Class 8A All-State honors.

He also competed in the 100 metres, 200 metres, 4 × 100 metres relay and long jump.

== College career ==
McKinnon accepted a football scholarship from Florida International University. As a true freshman, he appeared in 11 games with one start. He was a backup cornerback and focused mostly on special teams. He tallied 10 tackles, one pass defensed, one forced fumble and one fumble recovery.

As a sophomore, he appeared in 5 games with 2 starts. He had one tackle, one forced fumble and one fumble recovery.

As a junior, he appeared in all 12 games with 9 starts. He registered 37 tackles (2 for loss), 2 interceptions, 5 passes defensed, one fumble recovery and one forced fumble. He had 7 tackles and a safety against the University of Pittsburgh. He made 6 tackles (one for loss) against the University of Texas at San Antonio. He recorded the fifth-longest interception return in school history, with a 71-yard return for a touchdown against North Texas University.

As a senior, he started all 12 games, totaling 54 tackles (2.5 for loss), 3 interceptions, 8 passes defensed, 0.5 sacks and one forced a fumble. He had 9 tackles against Florida Atlantic University. He made 8 tackles and one forced fumble against Middle Tennessee State University.

== Professional career ==
=== Dallas Cowboys ===
McKinnon was signed as an undrafted free agent by the Dallas Cowboys after the 2016 NFL draft on May 6. He was waived by the Cowboys on August 29, 2016.

=== Tennessee Titans ===
On November 15, 2016, McKinnon was signed to the Tennessee Titans' practice squad.

=== Dallas Cowboys (second stint) ===
On January 16, 2017, McKinnon signed a reserve/future contract with the Cowboys. He was released on July 20, 2017.

=== Washington Redskins ===
On July 29, 2017, McKinnon was signed by the Washington Redskins. He was waived on September 2, 2017.

=== New York Giants ===
On November 28, 2017, McKinnon was signed to the New York Giants' practice squad. He signed a reserve/future contract with the Giants on January 1, 2018. He was waived on June 4, 2018.

=== Cleveland Browns ===
On July 30, 2018, McKinnon signed with the Cleveland Browns. On September 2, 2018, McKinnon was waived by the Browns and was signed to the practice squad the next day. McKinnon was promoted to the active roster on October 2, 2018. McKinnon was waived by the Browns on October 9, 2018, two days after making his NFL debut against the Baltimore Ravens. He was subsequently re-signed by the Browns to their practice squad the next day. He was released from the Browns' practice squad on October 13, 2018.

=== Philadelphia Eagles ===
On November 20, 2018, McKinnon was signed to the Philadelphia Eagles practice squad.

McKinnon signed a reserve/future contract with the Eagles on January 14, 2019. He was waived during final roster cuts on August 30, 2019.

=== New York Guardians ===
In October 2019, McKinnon was selected by the New York Guardians in the 2020 XFL draft. He signed a contract with the team on February 10, 2020. He had his contract terminated when the league suspended operations on April 10, 2020.

== Personal life ==
McKinnon is cousin to Richard Leonard, who currently plays cornerback for the Calgary Stampeders and former Arena Football League player Cedric McKinnon.
