= Blaine Woodson =

American football player (born 1995)

Profile
- Position: Defensive lineman

Personal information
- Born: October 30, 1995 (age 31); Stroudsburg, Pennsylvania, U.S.
- Listed height: 6 ft 2 in (1.88 m)
- Listed weight: 280 lb (127 kg)

Career information
- High school: Stroudsburg
- College: Delaware

Career history
- 2018: San Francisco 49ers*
- 2018: Cleveland Browns*
- 2018: Ottawa Redblacks
- * Offseason or practice squad member only

Career CFL statistics
- Tackles: 2
- Stats at CFL.ca

Blaine Chad Woodson (born October 30, 1995) is an American former professional football player who was a defensive lineman for the Ottawa Redblacks of the Canadian Football League (CFL). He was signed by the San Francisco 49ers of the National Football League (NFL) as an undrafted free agent in 2018 after playing college football for the Delaware Fightin' Blue Hens. He spent parts of training camp with the 49ers and Cleveland Browns in 2018 before signing in with the Redblacks of the CFL.
