= Daniel Ekuale =

Somoan American football player (born 1994)

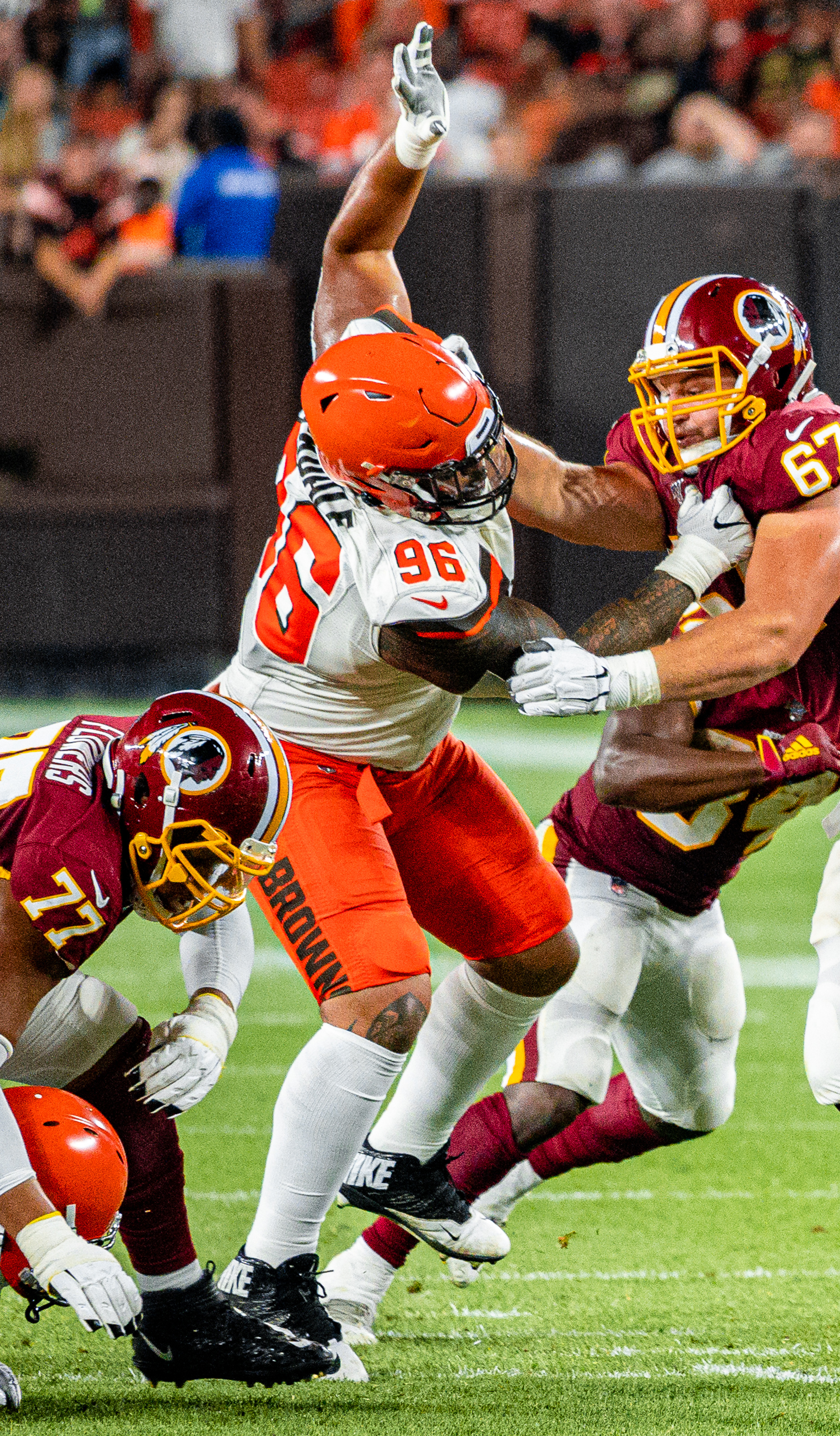
- Ekuale with the Cleveland Browns in 2019

Washington Commanders
- Position: Defensive tackle
- Roster status: Practice squad

Personal information
- Born: January 13, 1994 (age 32); Pago Pago, American Samoa
- Listed height: 6 ft 3 in (1.91 m)
- Listed weight: 300 lb (136 kg)

Career information
- High school: Nuʻuuli Voc-Tech (Tafuna, American Samoa)
- College: Washington State (2013–2017)
- NFL draft: 2018: undrafted

Career history
- Cleveland Browns (2018–2019); Jacksonville Jaguars (2020); New England Patriots (2021–2024); Pittsburgh Steelers (2025); Washington Commanders (2026–present)*
- * Offseason or practice squad member only

Career NFL statistics as of 2025
- Total tackles: 97
- Sacks: 6.0
- Forced fumbles: 1
- Pass deflections: 2
- Stats at Pro Football Reference

Tanielu "Daniel" Ekuale (born January 13, 1994) is an American Samoan professional American football defensive tackle for the Washington Commanders of the National Football League (NFL). He played college football for the Washington State Cougars.

== Early life ==
Ekuale was born and grew in Pago Pago, American Samoa and attended Nuʻuuli Vocational Technical High School. He was rated the best college prospect for his class in American Samoa by most recruiting services and committed to play college football at Washington State University over offers from Oregon, Oregon State and Washington and after originally committing to play at Hawaii.

== College career ==
Ekuale was a member of the Washington State Cougars for five seasons, redshirting his true freshman season. He became a starter at nose tackle for the Cougars during his redshirt junior season, recording a career-high 23 tackles (2.5 for loss) and a sack. Ekuale entered his redshirt senior season on the watch list for the Polynesian College Football Player of the Year and made 17 tackles (3.5 for loss) and one sack while starting 12 of WSU's 13 games. He finished his collegiate career appearing in 51 games with 21 starts, with 71 total tackles (14 for loss) with three sacks and two forced fumbles.

== Professional career ==
Pre-draft measurables
Height	Weight	Arm length	Hand span	Wingspan	40-yard dash	10-yard split	20-yard split	20-yard shuttle	Three-cone drill	Vertical jump	Broad jump	Bench press
6 ft 3 1/4 in (1.91 m)	299 lb (136 kg)	31 7/8 in (0.81 m)	9 in (0.23 m)	6 ft 5 3/4 in (1.97 m)	5.24 s	1.78 s	2.98 s	4.70 s	7.52 s	31.5 in (0.80 m)	8 ft 2 in (2.49 m)	23 reps
All values from Pro Day

=== Cleveland Browns ===
Ekuale signed with the Cleveland Browns as an undrafted free agent on May 4, 2018. He was waived at the end of training camp but re-signed to the Browns' practice squad on September 2, 2018. Ekuale was removed from the practice squad on December 6, 2018, after receiving a four-game suspension for violating the NFL's performance-enhancing substance policy.

Ekuale signed a reserve/future contract with the Browns on January 2, 2019, and made the 53-man roster out of training camp. Ekuale made his NFL debut on September 8, 2019, against the Tennessee Titans. The Browns placed Ekuale on injured reserve after sustaining a calf injury while playing against the New England Patriots in Week 8. He finished the season with four tackles, one for a loss, in seven games played.

Ekuale was waived by the Browns on September 5, 2020.

=== Jacksonville Jaguars ===
On September 8, 2020, Ekuale was signed to the Jacksonville Jaguars practice squad. He was promoted to the active roster on September 28, 2020.

In Week 13 against the Minnesota Vikings, Ekuale recorded his first career sack on Kirk Cousins during the 27–24 overtime loss.

On August 31, 2021, Ekuale was waived by the Jaguars.

=== New England Patriots ===
On September 5, 2021, the New England Patriots signed Ekuale to their practice squad. Ekuale spent the entire regular season on the Patriots' practice squad, but was elevated to the 53-man roster a total of eight times. On December 6, Ekuale had 2 tackles and sack in the Patriots 14–10 win over the Buffalo Bills. He signed a reserve/future contract with the Patriots on January 25, 2022.

Ekuale was suspended the first two games of the 2022 season for violating the NFL's performance-enhancing substance policy.

On March 23, 2023, Ekuale re-signed with the Patriots. He suffered a torn biceps in Week 3 and was placed on injured reserve on September 26.

Ekuale started 16 contests for New England during the 2024 season, recording 52 combined tackles and one sack.

=== Pittsburgh Steelers ===
On March 16, 2025, Ekuale signed a one-year, $2.8 million contract with the Pittsburgh Steelers. In seven appearances as a reserve lineman for the Steelers, he recorded one pass deflection and six combined tackles. In Week 8 against the Green Bay Packers, Ekuale suffered a torn ACL, causing him to be placed on season-ending injured reserve. On November 25, Ekuale was suspended for five games after violating the NFL's performance-enhancing substance policy.

=== Washington Commmanders ===
On November 4, 2026, the Washington Commanders signed Ekuale to their practice squad.

== Personal life ==
In June 2025, Ekuale got engaged to Apolonia Calleja.
