= Montrel Meander =

American football player (born 1994)

No. 41
- Position: Linebacker

Personal information
- Born: September 20, 1994 (age 32); Amarillo, Texas
- Listed height: 6 ft 2 in (1.88 m)
- Listed weight: 215 lb (98 kg)

Career information
- High school: Palo Duro; Amarillo, Texas
- College: Grambling State
- NFL draft: 2018: undrafted

Career history
- Cleveland Browns (2018)*; Oakland Raiders (2018); New York Jets (2019)*; Cleveland Browns (2019–2021)
- * Offseason or practice squad member only
- Stats at Pro Football Reference

Montrel Meander (born September 20, 1994) is an American former football linebacker. He played college football at Grambling State.

== Professional career ==
=== Cleveland Browns ===
Meander was signed by the Cleveland Browns as an undrafted free agent on May 4, 2018. He was waived on September 1, 2018, and was signed to the practice squad the next day.

=== Oakland Raiders ===
On November 30, 2018, the Oakland Raiders signed Meander off the Browns practice squad.

Meander was waived by the Raiders on June 11, 2019.

=== New York Jets ===
On June 12, 2019, Meander was claimed off waivers by the New York Jets. He was waived on August 20, 2019.

=== Return to Cleveland Browns ===
On August 21, 2019, Meander was claimed off waivers by the Cleveland Browns. Meander was waived by the Browns on August 31, 2019.

Meander was drafted in the 6th round during phase four in the 2020 XFL Draft by the Dallas Renegades.

The Browns re-signed Meander to their practice squad on October 22, 2019. The Browns signed Meander to their reserve/futures list on December 30, 2019.

Meander was waived by the Browns on September 5, 2020. The Browns re-signed Meander to their practice squad on September 6, 2020. The Browns promoted him to their active roster on September 16, 2020. He was waived by the Browns on September 28, 2020, and re-signed to the Browns' practice squad on September 30, 2020. He was elevated to the active roster on December 26 and January 2, 2021, for the team's weeks 16 and 17 games against the New York Jets and Pittsburgh Steelers, and reverted to the practice squad after each game. He was placed on the practice squad/COVID-19 list by the Browns on January 7, 2021, and restored to the practice squad two days later.

Meander signed a reserve/futures contract with the Browns on January 18, 2021. The Browns waived Meander on August 16, 2021, but re-signed him on August 20, 2021. The Browns placed Meander on injured reserve on August 23, 2021.
