= Blake Jackson =

American gridiron football player (born 1994)

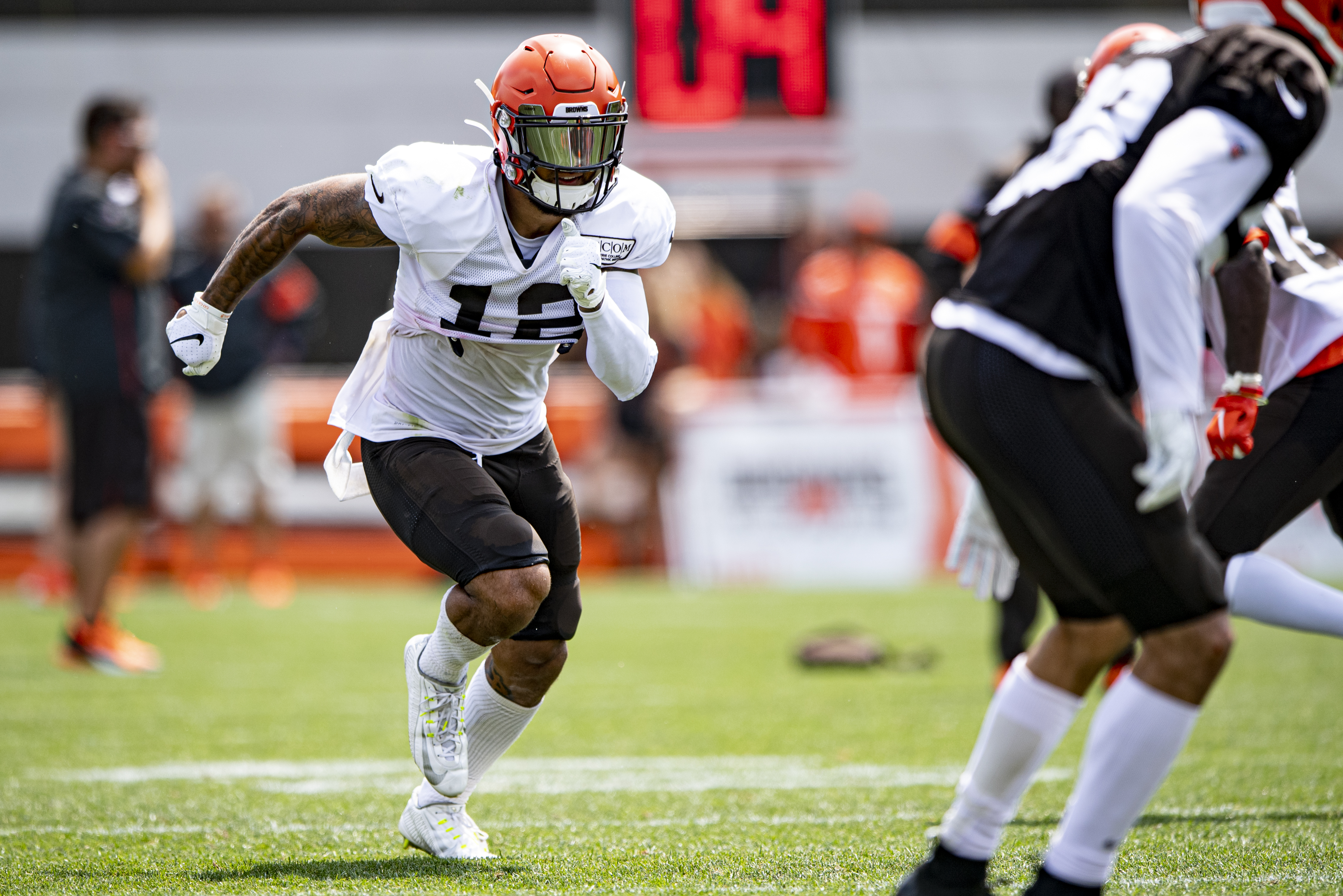
- Jackson with the Cleveland Browns in 2019

No. 8 – St. Louis Battlehawks
- Position: Wide receiver
- Roster status: Active

Personal information
- Born: March 7, 1994 (age 32); Houston, Texas, U.S.
- Listed height: 5 ft 11 in (1.80 m)
- Listed weight: 197 lb (89 kg)

Career information
- High school: Dobie (Houston, Texas)
- College: Mary Hardin–Baylor
- NFL draft: 2018: undrafted

Career history
- Calgary Stampeders (2018)*; Cleveland Browns (2018); Houston Roughnecks (2020); Winnipeg Blue Bombers (2021–2022)*; Seattle Sea Dragons (2023); St. Louis Battlehawks (2024–present)
- * Offseason or practice squad member only
- Stats at Pro Football Reference

Blake Jackson (born March 7, 1994) is an American football wide receiver for the St. Louis Battlehawks of the United Football League (UFL). He played college football at Mary Hardin–Baylor. Jackson has also been a member of the Calgary Stampeders, Cleveland Browns, Houston Roughnecks, Winnipeg Blue Bombers, and Seattle Sea Dragons.

== College career ==
Jackson played quarterback for Mary Hardin–Baylor. He was D3 All-American, ASC Offensive player of the year, and National Championship MVP. He finished his senior season at Mary Hardin–Baylor with over 3,500 yds passing with 36 TDs, and over 1100 yards rushing with 12 TDs.

== Professional career ==
=== Calgary Stampeders ===
After going undrafted in the 2018 NFL draft, Jackson signed with the Calgary Stampeders of the Canadian Football League (CFL) on April 23, 2018. He was released by the Stampeders at the conclusion of training camp.

=== Cleveland Browns ===
After attending The Spring League Showcase in La Jolla, California in July 2018, Jackson signed with the Cleveland Browns as a wide receiver on July 27, 2018. He was waived by the Browns on September 1, 2018. The Browns re-signed Jackson to their practice squad on October 16, 2018. Jackson was promoted to the Browns' active 53-man roster on December 28, 2018.

Jackson was waived with an injury designation on August 2, 2019. After clearing waivers, he was placed on the Browns' injured reserve list. He was later released with an injury settlement.

=== Houston Roughnecks ===
In October 2019, Jackson was selected by the Houston Roughnecks in the 2020 XFL draft. He had his contract terminated when the league suspended operations on April 10, 2020. He played in five games for the Roughnecks, catching five passes for 50 yards and one touchdown.

=== Winnipeg Blue Bombers ===
Jackson signed with the Winnipeg Blue Bombers of the Canadian Football League (CFL) on February 25, 2021. Jackson was having a promising training camp with the club in 2021 prior to suffering a season ending injury. He re-signed with the Blue Bombers on January 6, 2022.

=== Seattle Sea Dragons ===
On November 17, 2022, Jackson was drafted by the Seattle Sea Dragons of the XFL. The Sea Dragons folded when the XFL and USFL merged to create the United Football League (UFL).

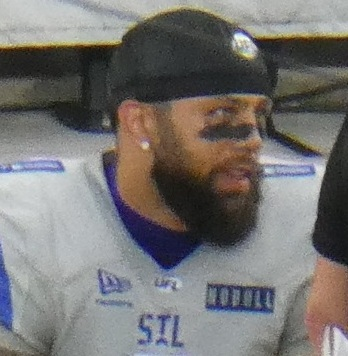
Jackson in 2026

=== St. Louis Battlehawks ===
On January 5, 2024, Jackson was selected by the St. Louis Battlehawks during the 2024 UFL dispersal draft. He signed with the team on January 25. He re-signed with the Battlehawks on October 29, 2024.

On November 3, 2026, Jackson re-signed with the Battlehawks for the 2027 UFL season.
