= Simeon Thomas =

American football player (born 1993)

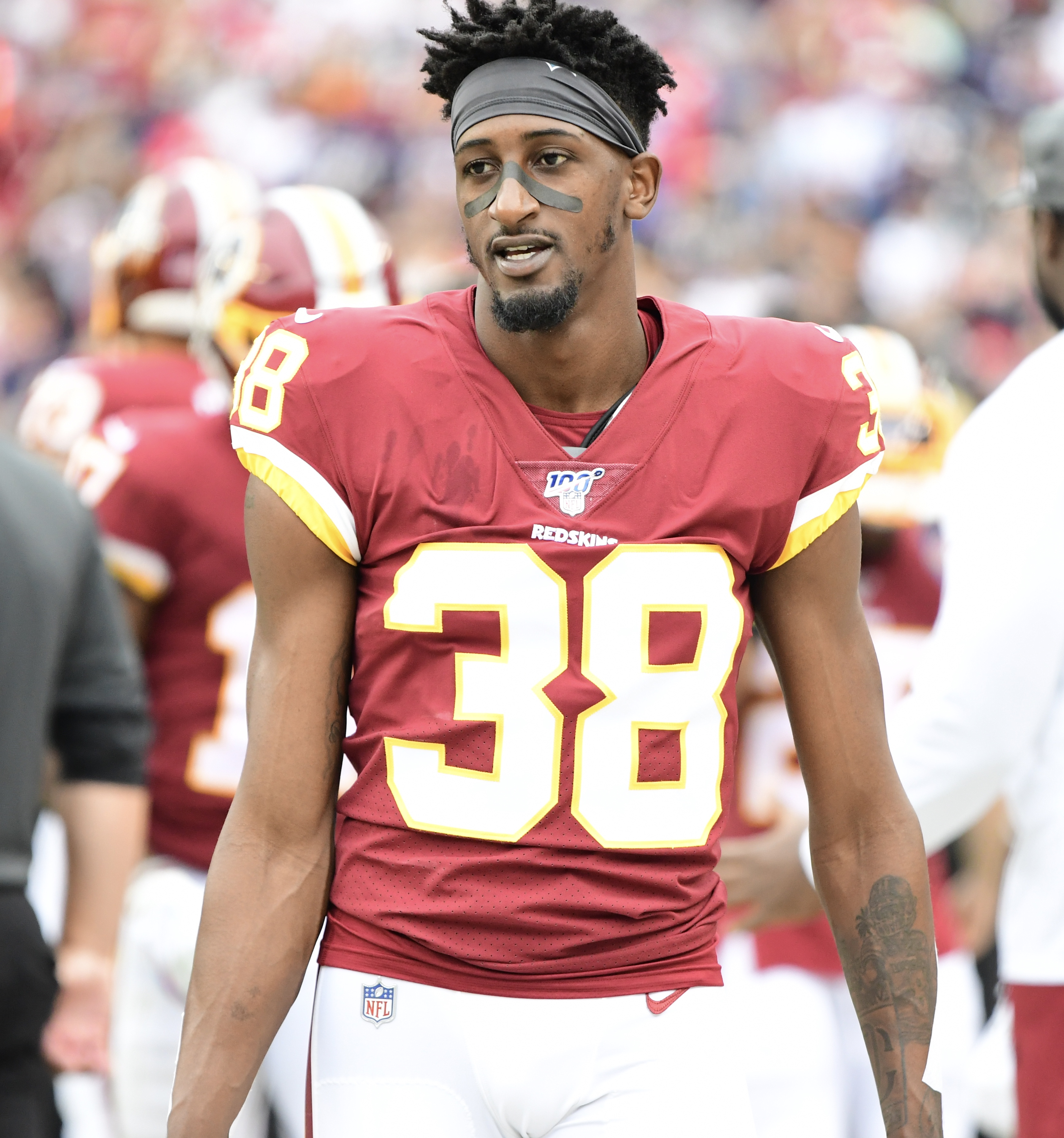
- Thomas with the Washington Redskins in 2019

No. 38
- Position: Cornerback

Personal information
- Born: September 22, 1993 (age 33); Miami, Florida, U.S.
- Listed height: 6 ft 3 in (1.91 m)
- Listed weight: 197 lb (89 kg)

Career information
- High school: Miami Carol City (Miami Gardens, Florida)
- College: Louisiana
- NFL draft: 2018: 6th round, 188th overall pick

Career history
- Cleveland Browns (2018)*; Seattle Seahawks (2018–2019)*; Washington Redskins / Football Team (2019–2020); Montreal Alouettes (2021)*
- * Offseason or practice squad member only

Career NFL statistics
- Tackles: 8
- Stats at Pro Football Reference

Simeon Thomas (born September 22, 1993) is an American former professional football player who was a cornerback in the National Football League (NFL). He played college football at Louisiana and was selected by the Cleveland Browns in the sixth round of the 2018 NFL draft. He was also a member of the Seattle Seahawks, Washington Redskins / Football Team and Montreal Alouettes.

== Early life ==
Thomas was ranked No. 20 in the Miami Herald list of the top Miami-Dade County recruits as a senior at Carol City High. He made 35 tackles with two interceptions as a senior and played in the Nike Dade against Broward All-Star game. Thomas made 65 tackles with three interceptions as a junior. A three-star recruit according to Scout.com, Thomas was ranked the No. 40 cornerback in his class. He committed to Louisiana over offers from Akron, Buffalo, Florida International, Ole Miss, South Alabama, and Syracuse.

== College career ==
In 2013, Thomas was among five Louisiana recruits involved with a scandal in which their ACT answers were supposedly changed by a test administrator. He missed the first three games the same year for academic reasons. He then sat out the entire 2014 season on academic suspension. Thomas also served a nine-game NCAA suspension in 2015, related to the recruiting violations from two years earlier. He didn't play the final three games because he wanted to save a season of eligibility.

Thomas played all 13 games in 2016, his only full season in college, and compiled 40 tackles, five pass breakups, two interceptions, a forced fumble and a fumble recovery.

In April 2017, Thomas was one of 13 Louisiana players arrested for stealing items from the dorm room of a former teammate who was in jail on a rape charge. The players stole US$2,400 worth in items, including video games and clothing. Charges were later reduced to misdemeanors.

Thomas finished his college career with 90 total tackles, three for a loss, two interceptions and one forced fumble.

== Professional career ==
=== Cleveland Browns ===
Thomas was selected by the Cleveland Browns in the sixth round (188th overall) of the 2018 NFL draft. On May 6, 2018, Thomas signed a rookie contract worth about $2.561 million. It includes a signing bonus worth almost $147,000. He was waived by the Browns on September 1, 2018.

=== Seattle Seahawks ===
On September 2, 2018, Thomas was claimed off waivers by the Seattle Seahawks. He was waived on September 8, 2018, and was re-signed to the practice squad. He was released on December 6, 2018, but re-signed six days later.

On January 7, 2019, Thomas signed a reserve/future contract with the Seahawks. He was waived on August 31, 2019, and was signed to the practice squad the next day.

=== Washington Redskins / Football Team ===
On September 10, 2019, Thomas was signed to the Washington Redskins' active roster. On December 10, 2019, Thomas was suspended four games for violating the league's policy on substances of abuse. He was reinstated from the first part of his suspension on December 30, 2019. Thomas was placed on injured reserve on September 5, 2020, and spent the first week of the regular season under suspension, before being waived with an injury settlement on September 14, 2020.

=== Montreal Alouettes ===
Thomas signed with the Montreal Alouettes of the Canadian Football League on June 30, 2021. He was released on July 26, 2021.

== Personal life ==
Thomas's cousin, wide receiver Kermit Whitfield, was a four-year player at Florida State and has been on the rosters of the Chicago Bears and Cincinnati Bengals. Another cousin, Marvin Bracy, also played at Florida State. Bracy was a two-time All-USA high school track and field team selection and a three-time U.S. national champion in the 60-meter dash.
