= Bob Wylie =

American gridiron football coach (born 1951)

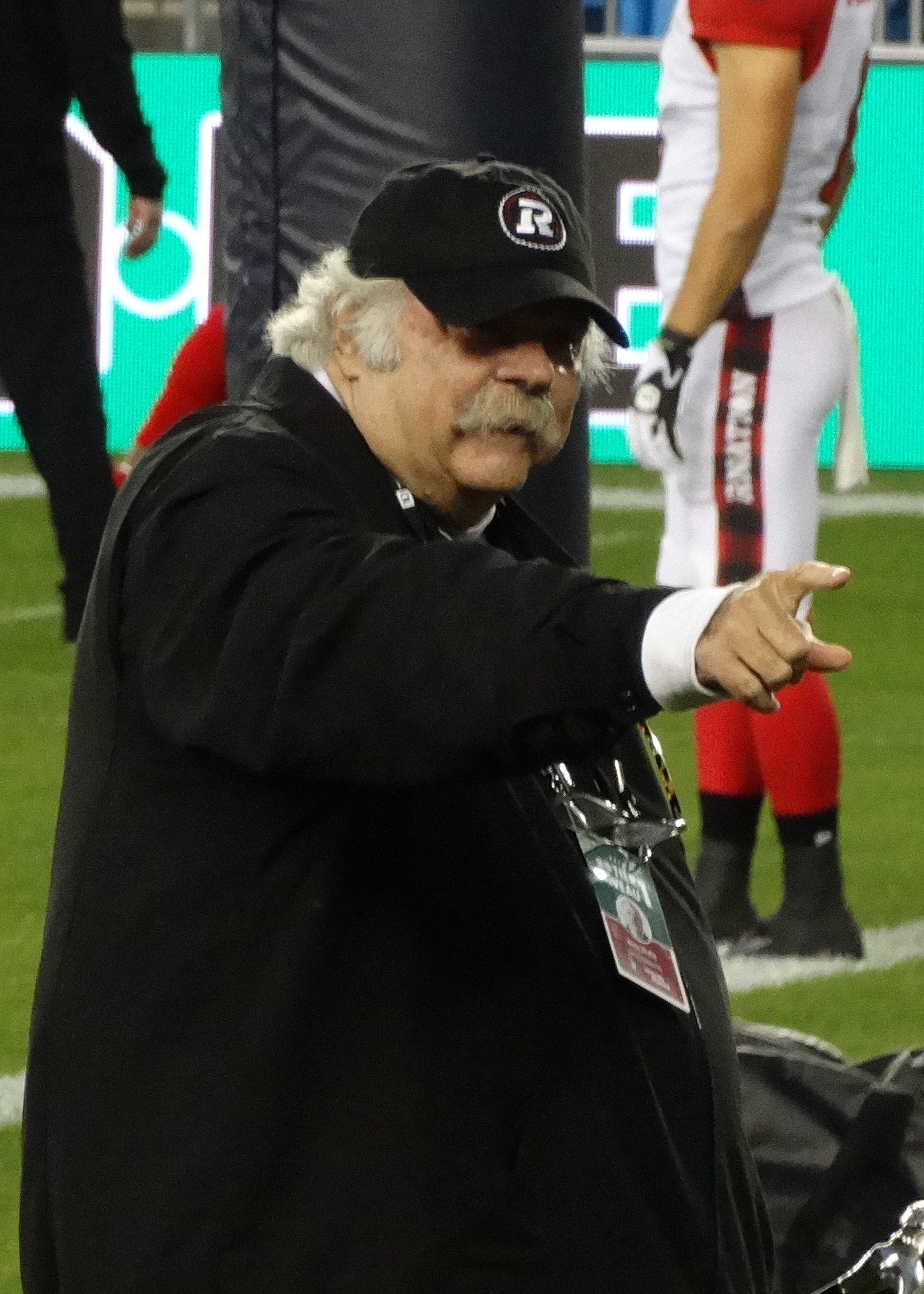
- Wylie with the Redblacks in 2021.

Personal information
- Born: February 16, 1951 (age 75); West Warwick, Rhode Island, U.S.

Career information
- College: Roger Williams

Career history
- Brown (1980–1982) Offensive line coach; Holy Cross (1983–1984) Offensive line coach; Ohio (1985–1987) Offensive coordinator; Colorado State (1988–1989) Offensive line coach; New York Jets (1990–1991) Tight ends coach; Tampa Bay Buccaneers (1992–1995) Offensive line coach; Cincinnati (1996) Offensive line coach; Cincinnati Bengals (1997–1998) Tight ends coach; Chicago Bears (1999–2003) Offensive line coach; Arizona Cardinals (2004) Offensive line coach; Syracuse (2005–2006) Offensive line coach; Winnipeg Blue Bombers (2007–2008) Offensive line coach; Saskatchewan Roughriders (2009) Offensive line coach; Denver Broncos (2010) Assistant offensive line coach; Oakland Raiders (2011) Offensive line coach; Winnipeg Blue Bombers (2014–2016) Offensive line coach; Cleveland Browns (2017–2018) Offensive line coach; Ottawa Redblacks (2020–2021) Offensive line coach; Vegas Vipers (2023) Offensive line coach

Robert Wylie (born February 16, 1951) is an American football coach. Wylie has worked on the coaching staffs of multiple teams in the Canadian Football League (CFL) and National Football League (NFL), including stints at the Oakland Raiders and the Cleveland Browns, both under head coach Hue Jackson. He also coached the offensive lines of the Winnipeg Blue Bombers and the Saskatchewan Roughriders of the CFL.

== Coaching career ==
=== Saskatchewan Roughriders ===
On March 16, 2009, Wylie was named the offensive line coach of the Saskatchewan Roughriders. The Roughriders went 10–7 in 2009 and made the playoffs. They would go on to lose the 97th Grey Cup to the Montreal Alouettes 27–28. Under his coaching, center Jeremy O'Day, and guard Gene Makowsky were named CFL All-Stars.

=== Denver Broncos ===
On January 22, 2010, Wylie was named an assistant offensive line coach for the Denver Broncos. The Broncos went 4–12 in 2010 and missed the playoffs. Head coach Josh McDaniels was fired during the season and Wylie was let go.

=== Oakland Raiders ===
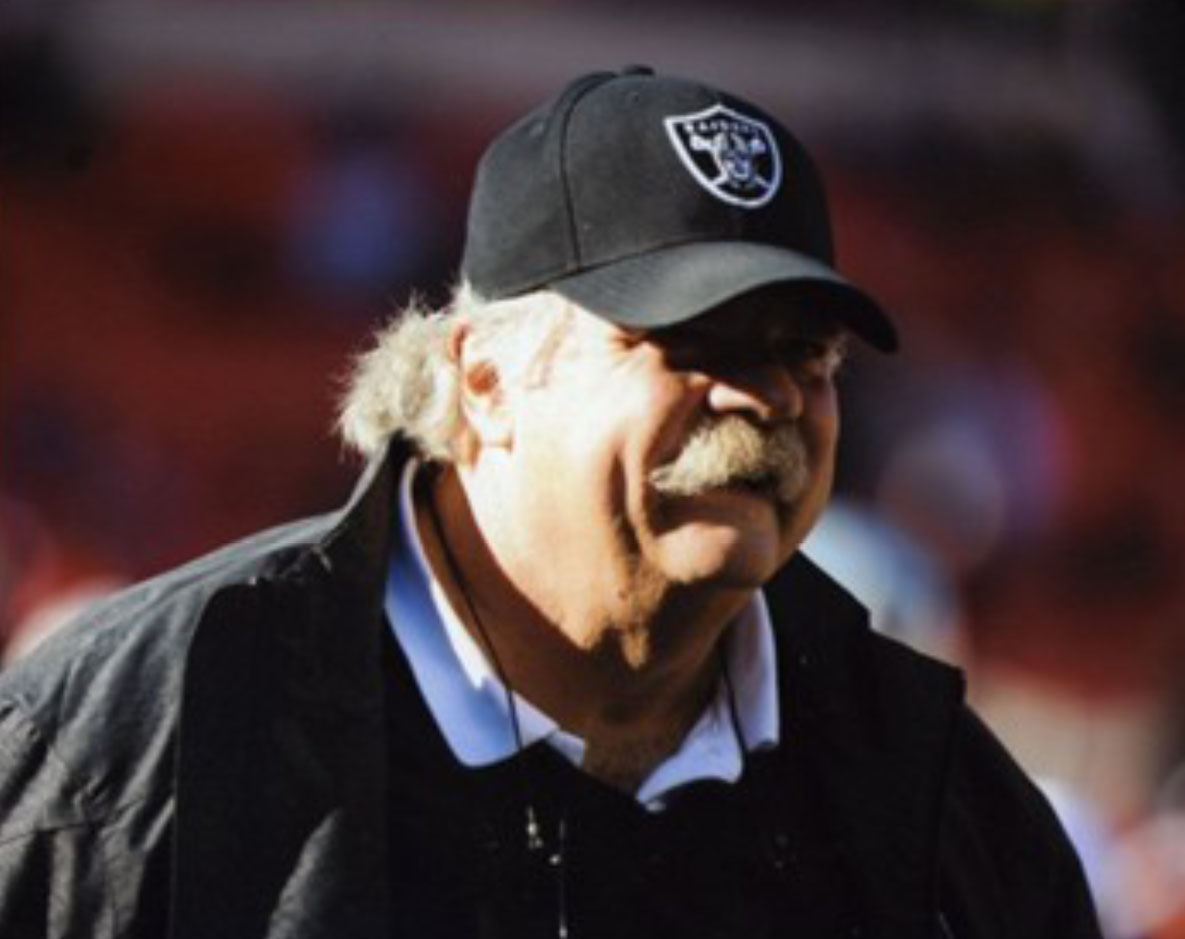
Wylie during his tenure with the Oakland Raiders.

On January 31, 2011, Wylie was named the offensive line coach for the Oakland Raiders. The Raiders went 8–8 in 2011 and missed the playoffs. Under his coaching, guard Stefen Wisniewski was named All-Rookie. When head coach Hue Jackson was fired at the end of the season, he was let go.

=== Winnipeg Blue Bombers (second stint) ===
On April 1, 2014, Wylie was named the offensive line coach for the Winnipeg Blue Bombers. During the 2014 season, the Blue Bombers went 7–11 and missed the playoffs.

At the end of the 2015 season the Bombers went 5–13 and missed the playoffs.

During his final season in Winnipeg, the 2016 Blue Bombers went 11–7 making the playoffs for the first time since 2011. They would go on to lose in the semi-final 32–31 to the BC Lions. Under his coaching, guard Travis Bond was named a CFL All-Star as well as an All-Division selection. After this season, Wylie left the CFL for the NFL.

=== Cleveland Browns ===
On January 19, 2017, Wylie was hired by the Cleveland Browns. During the 2017 season, the Browns went 0–16, as of 2025 the 2017 Cleveland Browns and the 2008 Detroit Lions are the only teams to go 0-16 in a season.

In 2018, Wylie was featured on HBO's Hard Knocks with the Browns, a television series produced by NFL Films. He was made famous after a video of him yelling "set hut" went viral. That year, the Browns went 7–8–1 and missed the playoffs.

On January 9, 2019 Wylie's contract was not renewed by the Browns.

=== Ottawa Redblacks ===
On December 12, 2019, Wylie was hired by the Ottawa Redblacks as the offensive line coach. After the 2020 CFL season was cancelled, Wylie coached for the Redblacks in 2021. He was not retained by the team for the 2022 season.

=== Vegas Vipers ===
Coach Rod Woodson of the Vegas Vipers hired Wylie as an assistant for the 2023 season. On January 1, 2024, it was announced the Vipers would not be a part of the United Football League (UFL) merger.
