= Christian Kirksey =

American football player (born 1992)

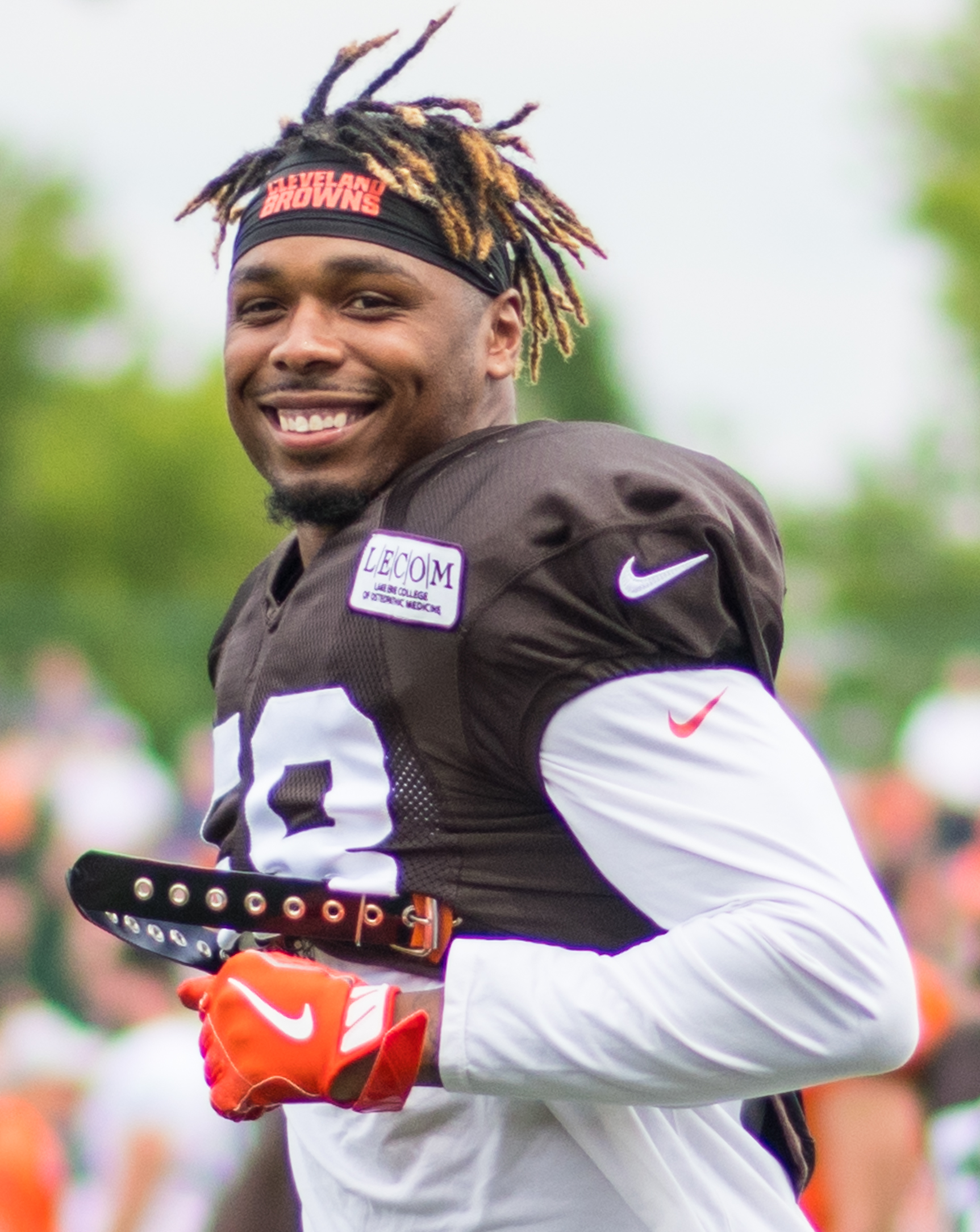
- Kirksey with the Cleveland Browns in 2018

No. 58
- Position: Linebacker

Personal information
- Born: August 31, 1992 (age 34); St. Louis, Missouri, U.S.
- Listed height: 6 ft 2 in (1.88 m)
- Listed weight: 235 lb (107 kg)

Career information
- High school: Hazelwood East (St. Louis)
- College: Iowa (2010–2013)
- NFL draft: 2014: 3rd round, 71st overall pick

Career history
- Cleveland Browns (2014–2019); Green Bay Packers (2020); Houston Texans (2021–2022); Buffalo Bills (2023)*
- * Offseason or practice squad member only

Career NFL statistics
- Total tackles: 726
- Sacks: 14.5
- Forced fumbles: 4
- Fumble recoveries: 6
- Pass deflections: 30
- Interceptions: 6
- Stats at Pro Football Reference

Christian Paul Kirksey (born August 31, 1992) is an American former professional football player who was a linebacker in the National Football League (NFL). He played college football for the Iowa Hawkeyes and was selected by the Cleveland Browns in the third round of the 2014 NFL draft. He was also a member of the Green Bay Packers, Houston Texans, and Buffalo Bills.

== Early life ==
Kirksey attended Hazelwood East High School in Hazelwood, Missouri, where he played on the football team and was coached by Mike Jones. He was first-team all-conference as a senior after earning honorable mention recognition as a junior. He recorded 163 tackles as a senior, with nine tackles for loss, three sacks, two interceptions, returning one for a touchdown. He helped his team win the state championship in his junior season and returned to playoffs the following year.

In addition to football, Kirksey participated in track & field at Hazelwood East, where he competed in relays and jumping events, helping his team win the state championship as a junior. He placed ninth in the triple jump at the 2009 MSHSAA State T&F Championships, with a leap of 44 ft 1 in. At the 2010 Suburban North Conference Championship, he placed fourth in the long jump (20 ft 12 in) and took bronze in the triple jump (45 ft 6 in).

Kirksey was considered a three-star recruit by the Rivals.com recruiting network.

== College career ==
Kirksey enrolled at the University of Iowa, where he was a member of the Iowa Hawkeyes football team from 2010 to 2013. As a true freshman in 2010, he played in 10 games, primarily on special teams, recording six total tackles. In 2011, he started all 13 games for the Hawkeyes, recording 62 tackles, five tackles for loss, one sack, one interception, three pass break-ups and two forced fumbles. As a junior in 2012, he was named a team captain. He started all 12 games, recording 95 tackles, 3.5 tackles for loss and two quarterback sacks. He also returned two interceptions for touchdowns (one 68 yards vs. Minnesota and one 18 yards against Indiana), had four recovered fumbles, two pass break-ups and one forced fumble. In 2013, as a senior and team captain, he started all 13 games at outside linebacker, finishing third on team with 104 tackles. He also had five tackles for loss and 2.5 sacks, two recovered fumbles and two forced fumbles, one interception and one pass break-up. He earned honorable mention All-Big Ten Conference following the season.

== Professional career ==
=== Pre-draft ===
On December 30, 2013, it was announced that Kirksey had accepted his invitation to appear in the 2014 Senior Bowl. Throughout the week, leading up to the game, Kirksey impressed scouts and team representatives during practice by displaying his athleticism, explosiveness, and ability to finish plays. On January 25, 2014, he participated at the Senior Bowl and recorded six combined tackles with 1.5 tackles for a loss during the North's 20–10 loss to the South. He had an impressive performance playing for former Atlanta Falcons head coach Mike Smith's North team. He was one of 35 collegiate linebackers to receive an invitation to attend the NFL Combine in Indianapolis, Indiana. Kirksey attended the NFL combine, but opted to forgo the majority of combine drills and only perform the vertical jump, broad jump, and bench press. His 16 reps tied for 23rd out of the 25 linebackers who participated and he finished 21st out of 30 linebackers in the vertical. Kirksey's best performance at the combine was in the broad jump where he tied for fifth out of 30 players in his position. On March 24, 2014, Kirksey participated at Iowa's pro day, along with C. J. Fiedorowicz, Anthony Hitchens, James Morris, and nine other prospects. Representatives and scouts from 28 NFL teams attended as he performed all of the combine and positional drills and was able to increase his vertical by four inches (36"). Kirksey's unofficial time in the 40-yard dash would've garnered him third among his position group at the combine. At the conclusion of the pre-draft process, Kirksey was projected to be a fourth or fifth round pick by the majority of NFL draft experts and scouts. He was ranked as the 13th best outside linebacker prospect in the draft by NFLDraftScout.com.

External videos
- Kirksey's NFL Combine workout

Pre-draft measurables
| Height | Weight | Arm length | Hand span | 40-yard dash | 10-yard split | 20-yard split | 20-yard shuttle | Three-cone drill | Vertical jump | Broad jump | Bench press |
|---|---|---|---|---|---|---|---|---|---|---|---|
| 6 ft 1 3/4 in (1.87 m) | 233 lb (106 kg) | 32 3/8 in (0.82 m) | 9 3/8 in (0.24 m) | 4.58 s | 1.59 s | 2.64 s | 4.42 s | 7.11 s | 32 in (0.81 m) | 10 ft 2 in (3.10 m) | 16 reps |
All values from NFL Combine/Iowa's Pro Day

=== Cleveland Browns ===
==== 2014 ====
The Cleveland Browns selected Kirksey in the third round (71st overall) of the 2014 NFL draft. He was the ninth linebacker selected in 2014. On June 5, 2014, the Browns signed Kirksey to a four-year, $3.04 million contract that includes a signing bonus of $662,500.

Throughout training camp, Kirksey competed against Craig Robertson for the job as the starting right inside linebacker. Head coach Mike Pettine named him the backup right inside linebacker to Robertson to begin the regular season.

He made his professional regular season debut in the Browns' season-opener at the Pittsburgh Steelers and recorded one solo tackle and made his first career sack on Ben Roethlisberger during their 30–27 loss. The following week, he earned the first start of his career against the New Orleans Saints, after starting right outside linebacker Barkevious Mingo was unable to play due to a shoulder injury. He went on to finish the game with four combined tackles as the Browns won 26–24. On October 19, 2014, Kirksey recorded a season-high nine combined tackles as the Browns lost 24–6 at the Jacksonville Jaguars. Kirksey started over Robertson during a Week 11 matchup against the Houston Texans and tied his season-high of nine combined tackles in Cleveland's 23–7 loss. He started from Weeks 12–15 after Karlos Dansby suffered a knee injury during the loss to Houston. He finished his rookie season with 81 combined tackles (47 solo), two sacks, two pass deflections, and a forced fumble in eight starts, 16 games, and 343 defensive snaps.

==== 2015 ====
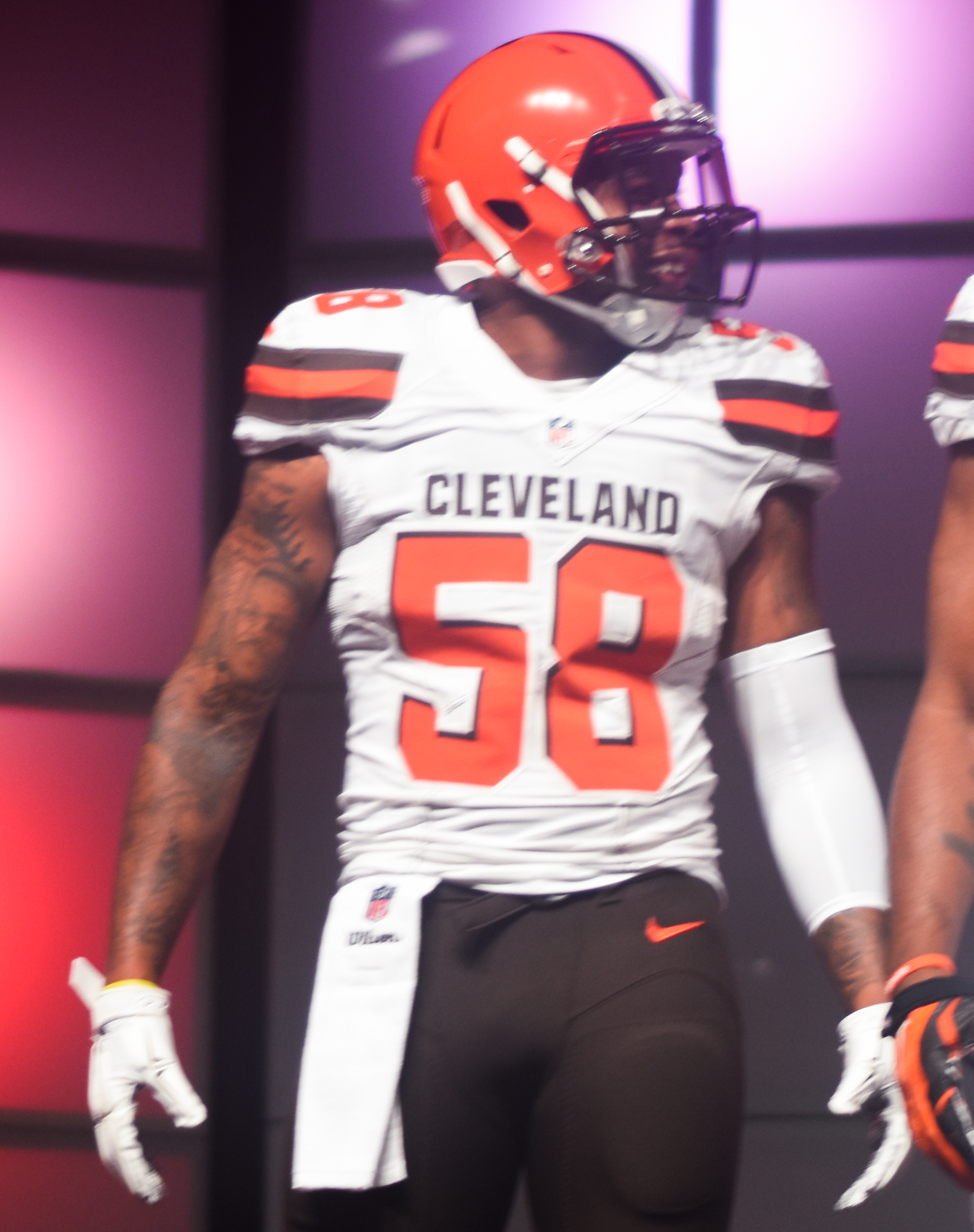
Kirksey with the Browns in 2015

Kirksey continued to compete for the starting inside linebacker role against Robertson throughout training camp. He started the regular season as the backup inside linebacker behind Robertson.

On October 4, 2015, Kirksey earned his first start of the season after Robertson suffered an ankle injury. He went on to collect five combined tackles and sacked San Diego Chargers quarterback Philip Rivers, in Cleveland's 30–27 loss at San Diego. He started the next four games at inside linebacker (Weeks 4–7) in place of Robertson. In Week 6, he recorded a season-high nine combined tackles as the Browns lost 26–23 to the Denver Broncos. On November 15, 2015, Kirksey collected a combined four tackles and sacked Steelers' quarterback Roethlisberger during a 30–9 loss at the Steelers. He finished the 2015 season with 63 combined tackles (40 solo), 3.5 sacks, and a pass deflection in 16 games and five starts.

==== 2016 ====
Kirksey was slated to be the starting inside linebacker after Robertson departed during free agency to the Saints. New head coach Hue Jackson named Kirksey the starting right inside linebacker, alongside Demario Davis, to start the 2016 season.

He started the Browns' season-opener at the Philadelphia Eagles and recorded six combined tackles and sacked Carson Wentz during 29–10 loss. On October 9, 2016, Kirksey collected a season-high 16 combined tackles in the Browns' 33–13 loss to the New England Patriots. During a Week 10 contest at the Baltimore Ravens, he made 13 combined tackles and deflected a pass as the Ravens routed the Browns 28–7. In Week 17, Kirksey recorded 12 combined tackles and sacked Roethlisberger, for his third time in his career, during a 27–24 loss at the Steelers. Kirksey had an impressive season in 2016 and led the Browns with 148 combined tackles (96 solo), 2.5 sacks, and three pass deflections in 16 games and 16 starts.

==== 2017 ====
On May 30, 2017, the Browns signed Kirksey to a four-year, $38 million contract extension that includes $20 million guaranteed and a signing bonus of $6 million.

Former Browns' defensive coordinator Ray Horton was fired after the 2016 season and replaced by Gregg Williams who switched the base defense from a 3-4 defense to a 4-3 defense. Kirksey was moved from starting inside linebacker to starting weakside linebacker.

During a Week 2 matchup at the Ravens, Kirksey made nine combined tackles and sacked Joe Flacco as the Browns lost 24–10. On October 22, 2017, he recorded a career-high 17 combined tackles during a 12–9 loss to the Tennessee Titans. On November 19, 2017, Kirksey collected 14 combined tackles and sacked Jaguars quarterback Blake Bortles in a 19–7 loss. He finished the season with 136 combined tackles (86 solo), five pass deflections, and 3.5 sacks in 16 games and 16 starts. His 138 tackles finished second in the team, behind Joe Schobert's 144. Pro Football Focus gave Kirksey an overall grade of 59.6, ranking 52nd among all qualified linebackers in 2017.

==== 2018 ====
On October 7, 2018, Kirksey recorded a season-high 12 tackles against the Baltimore Ravens. On October 14, Kirksey intercepted Los Angeles Chargers' Philip Rivers, his first-career interception. The very next week he would pick off Tampa Bay Buccaneers' quarterback Jameis Winston and recover a Cameron Brate fumble on October 21, 2018, marking his second-career interception and third-career fumble recovery. On November 7, he was placed on injured reserve with a hamstring injury.

==== 2019 ====
On September 21, 2019, Kirksey was placed on injured reserve with a chest injury.

On March 10, 2020, Kirksey was released by the Browns after six seasons.

=== Green Bay Packers ===
On March 17, 2020, Kirksey signed a two-year, $13 million contract with the Green Bay Packers.

Kirksey made his debut with the Packers in Week 1 against the Minnesota Vikings. During the game, Kirksey led the team with 12 tackles (6 solo) in the 43–34 win. This victory was Kirksey's first Week 1 win in his career. In Week 2 against the Detroit Lions, Kirksey recorded another 12 tackles during the 42–21 win. He was placed on injured reserve on October 3, 2020, with a pectoral injury. He was activated on November 14, 2020. In Week 11 against the Indianapolis Colts, Kirksey led the team with 11 tackles and recorded his first interception as a Packer off a pass thrown by Philip Rivers during the 34–31 overtime loss. In Week 16 against the Titans on Sunday Night Football, Kirksey sacked and intercepted Ryan Tannehill once each, also recording a solo tackle for loss and a pass deflection during the 40–14 win.

On February 19, 2021, Kirksey was released by the Packers.

=== Houston Texans ===
Kirksey signed with the Houston Texans on March 24, 2021. He was named the Texans starting middle linebacker in 2021. He started the first eight games before being placed on injured reserve on November 6, 2021. He was activated on December 4.

On March 11, 2022, Kirksey signed a two-year contract extension with the Texans. On August 28, 2023, Kirksey was released.

=== Buffalo Bills ===
On August 30, 2023, Kirksey was signed to the practice squad of the Buffalo Bills. On September 21, he announced his retirement from the NFL.

On April 15, 2024, Kirksey announced that he would sign a one–day contract to retire a Cleveland Brown.

== NFL career statistics ==
=== Regular season ===
| Year | Team | Games | | Tackles | | | | Interceptions | | | | | | Fumbles | |
| Year | Team | GP | GS | Cmb | Solo | Ast | Sck | PD | Int | Yds | Avg | Lng | TD | FF | FR |
|---|---|---|---|---|---|---|---|---|---|---|---|---|---|---|---|
| 2014 | CLE | 16 | 8 | 78 | 44 | 34 | 2.0 | 2 | 0 | 0 | 0.0 | 0 | 0 | 1 | 0 |
| 2015 | CLE | 16 | 5 | 63 | 40 | 23 | 3.5 | 1 | 0 | 0 | 0.0 | 0 | 0 | 1 | 1 |
| 2016 | CLE | 16 | 16 | 145 | 93 | 52 | 2.5 | 3 | 0 | 0 | 0.0 | 0 | 0 | 0 | 0 |
| 2017 | CLE | 16 | 16 | 133 | 81 | 52 | 3.5 | 5 | 0 | 0 | 0.0 | 0 | 0 | 2 | 1 |
| 2018 | CLE | 7 | 7 | 39 | 25 | 14 | 0.0 | 5 | 2 | 17 | 8.5 | 13 | 0 | 0 | 1 |
| 2019 | CLE | 2 | 2 | 11 | 6 | 5 | 0.0 | 0 | 0 | 0 | 0.0 | 0 | 0 | 0 | 0 |
| 2020 | GB | 11 | 11 | 73 | 42 | 31 | 2.0 | 4 | 2 | 18 | 9.0 | 10 | 0 | 0 | 0 |
| 2021 | HOU | 13 | 12 | 93 | 55 | 38 | 0.0 | 8 | 1 | 1 | 1.0 | 1 | 0 | 0 | 2 |
| 2022 | HOU | 17 | 17 | 124 | 82 | 42 | 3.0 | 5 | 2 | 18 | 9.0 | 18 | 0 | 0 | 1 |
| Total | | 114 | 94 | 778 | 481 | 291 | 16.5 | 33 | 7 | 54 | 7.7 | 18 | 0 | 4 | 6 |
Source: NFL.com

=== Postseason ===
| Year | Team | Games | | Tackles | | | | Interceptions | | | | | | Fumbles | |
| Year | Team | GP | GS | Cmb | Solo | Ast | Sck | PD | Int | Yds | Avg | Lng | TD | FF | FR |
|---|---|---|---|---|---|---|---|---|---|---|---|---|---|---|---|
| 2020 | GB | 2 | 1 | 6 | 4 | 2 | 0.0 | 0 | 0 | 0 | 0.0 | 0 | 0 | 0 | 0 |
| Total | | 2 | 1 | 6 | 4 | 2 | 0.0 | 0 | 0 | 0 | 0.0 | 0 | 0 | 0 | 0 |
Source: football-reference.com

== In popular culture ==
Kirksey is featured in Madden NFL 15; however, when used in the gamemode "Madden Ultimate Team" and he is on the Tennessee Titans; due to a glitch, his in-game avatar appears as 1 ft 2 in in height, which makes him the first "Foottall" player in Madden history. Kirksey later appeared in a trailer EA Sports created for the game that features the glitch.
