= 2017 Cleveland Browns season =

69th season in franchise history, second team in NFL history to go 0–16

- Owner: Jimmy Haslam
- General manager: Sashi Brown (fired Week 13); John Dorsey
- Head coach: Hue Jackson
- Home stadium: FirstEnergy Stadium

Results
- Record: 0–16
- Division place: 4th AFC North
- Playoffs: Did not qualify
- Pro Bowlers: LB Joe Schobert

Uniform
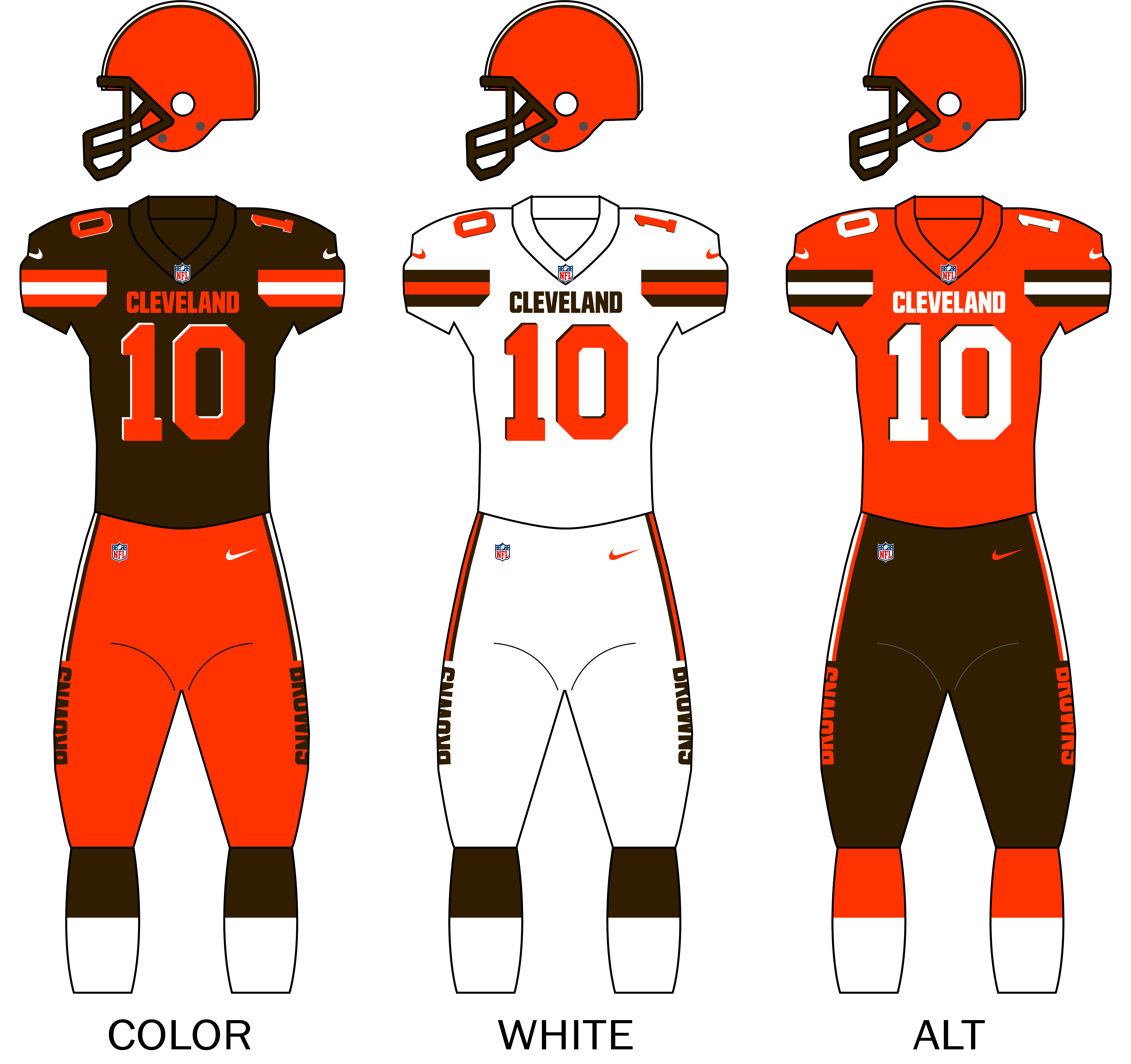

The 2017 season was the Cleveland Browns' 65th in the National Football League (NFL), their 69th overall, their second under head coach Hue Jackson and their second and final season under general manager Sashi Brown. The Browns failed to improve on their 1–15 record from the previous season, as they instead joined the 2008 Detroit Lions as one of two teams in NFL history to finish a season 0–16 since the season was expanded to 16 games in 1978, and the last due to the NFL expanding its regular season schedule to 17 games in 2021. They extended a losing streak that began in the final game of the previous season. The Browns became the twelfth NFL team to have gone winless playing eight games or more and the fourth since the AFL–NFL merger in 1970. The Browns and the Lions share another dubious kinship: they are the only remaining pre-merger NFL franchises in the Super Bowl era to have never appeared in the Super Bowl. All ten original AFL franchises have played in a Super Bowl.

In going 0–16, the Browns became the first franchise in NFL history to have multiple and consecutive seasons with 15 or more losses. They were eliminated from the AFC North title contention in Week 11, extending an active NFL record drought of 25 consecutive seasons without a division title and would subsequently be eliminated from playoff contention the next week, extending their franchise-record playoff drought to 15 consecutive seasons. With the Buffalo Bills qualifying for the postseason for the first time since 1999, the Browns had the longest postseason drought in the NFL and the second longest in the four major American sports leagues, only behind the Seattle Mariners of Major League Baseball.

The Browns finished the season with a losing record for the tenth consecutive year, extending a franchise record. With the Los Angeles Rams posting a winning record, the Browns now had the most consecutive losing seasons in the NFL. It was the first season in which they lost every home game since 1999. The Browns also extended their away losing streak to 21 games and their losing streak within the AFC North to 17 games, both dating back to the 2015 season. The Browns finished the 2017 season with combined 1–31 record over the previous two seasons, an NFL record for worst winning percentage over a two-season span. After starting the 2014 season with a promising 6–3 record heading into Week 11, the Browns lost 50 of 55 games between that point and the end of the 2017 season.

On December 7, Brown was relieved of his duties as executive vice president. John Dorsey, formerly of the Kansas City Chiefs, was hired as general manager the same day. To further add to these failures, offensive tackle Joe Thomas missed the Pro Bowl for the first time in his career, as he tore his left triceps on October 22, ending his season. Before his injury, Thomas had not missed a single snap since joining the league in 2007, a total of 10,363 plays. He then retired on March 14, 2018, following the season.

The season saw the Browns play in London for the first time in franchise history, in a 33–16 loss to the Minnesota Vikings on October 29.

== Offseason ==
=== Coaching changes ===
On January 7, the Browns fired defensive coordinator Ray Horton. A day later, they hired Gregg Williams as his replacement. Williams had previously served as the defensive coordinator for the Los Angeles Rams.

On January 9, associate head coach Pep Hamilton left the Browns to become assistant head coach at the University of Michigan. Hamilton was also the Browns' quarterbacks coach.

On January 10, the Browns fired five assistant coaches: offensive line coach Hal Hunter, inside linebackers coach Johnny Holland, outside linebackers coach Ryan Slowik, defensive backs coach Louie Cioffi, and assistant defensive backs coach Cannon Matthews.

On January 13, the Browns hired DeWayne Walker as defensive backs coach. A day later, they hired Blake Williams as linebackers coach, Jerod Kruse as assistant defensive backs coach, and Bob Wylie as offensive line coach.

On January 17, the Browns fired defensive line coach Robert Nunn and hired Clyde Simmons as his replacement.

On February 8, the Browns hired former Buffalo Bills assistant David Lee as their quarterbacks coach.

=== Roster changes ===
==== Free agents ====
The following players, who played for the Browns in 2016, were eligible for free agency in 2017.

Position	Player	Tag	2017 team	Signed
WR	Mario Alford	ERFA	Chicago Bears	September 12
RB	George Atkinson III	ERFA	Oakland Raiders	July 29
CB	Marcus Burley	RFA	Cleveland Browns	March 20
LB	Jamie Collins	UFA	Cleveland Browns	January 23
P	Britton Colquitt	UFA	Cleveland Browns	February 28
RB	Isaiah Crowell	RFA	Cleveland Browns	February 28
DE	Jamie Meder	ERFA	Cleveland Browns	March 28
RB	Rajion Neal	ERFA	Hamilton Tiger-Cats (CFL)	October 18
DE	Stephen Paea	UFA	Dallas Cowboys	March 10
OT	Austin Pasztor	UFA	Atlanta Falcons	August 18
FS	Jordan Poyer	UFA	Buffalo Bills	March 9
WR	Terrelle Pryor	UFA	Washington Redskins	March 10
RB	Glenn Winston	RFA		
DT	Gabe Wright	ERFA	Philadelphia Eagles	June 5
DE	Dylan Wynn	ERFA		

==== Releases ====
Position	Player	Released	2017 team	Signed
OL	Alvin Bailey	April 20		
TE	Gary Barnidge	April 28		
OT	Josh Boutte	May 15		
S	Trae Elston	April 20	Buffalo Bills	April 21
QB	Robert Griffin III	March 10		
CB	Joe Haden	August 30	Pittsburgh Steelers	August 30
CB	Tracy Howard	April 20	Jacksonville Jaguars	
WR	Andrew Hawkins	February 27	New England Patriots	
K	Brett Maher	May 2		
QB	Josh McCown	February 7	New York Jets	March 20
CB	Tramon Williams	February 7		

==== Signings ====
Position	Player	2016 Team	Signed
WR	Kenny Britt	Los Angeles Rams	March 9
K	Brett Maher	Hamilton Tiger-Cats (CFL)	March 20
C	Marcus Martin *	San Francisco 49ers	March 9
OT	Matt McCants	Chicago Bears	March 27
CB	Jason McCourty	Tennessee Titans	May 16
FS	Tyvis Powell *	Seattle Seahawks	February 6
C	J. C. Tretter	Green Bay Packers	March 9
WR	James Wright *	Cincinnati Bengals	March 14
G	Kevin Zeitler	Cincinnati Bengals	March 9

* Player was claimed off waivers

==== Trades ====
Date	Trade partner(s)	Player(s)/Pick(s) acquired	Player(s)/Pick(s) traded	Notes
March 9	Houston Texans	QB Brock Osweiler; 2017 6th round selection (No. 188); 2018 2nd round selection	2017 NFL Draft 4th round selection (No. 142)	

=== 2017 draft class ===
2017 Cleveland Browns draft
Round	Pick	Player	Position	College	Notes
1	1	Myles Garrett *	Defensive end	Texas A&M	
1	25	Jabrill Peppers	Safety	Michigan	from Houston
1	29	David Njoku *	Tight end	Miami	from Green Bay
2	52	DeShone Kizer	Quarterback	Notre Dame	from Tennessee
3	65	Larry Ogunjobi	Defensive tackle	Charlotte	
4	126	Howard Wilson	Cornerback	Houston	
5	160	Roderick Johnson	Offensive tackle	Florida State	from Minnesota via NY Jets
6	185	Caleb Brantley	Defensive tackle	Florida	
7	224	Zane Gonzalez	Placekicker	Arizona State	from NY Jets
7	252	Matt Dayes	Running back	NC State	compensatory pick from Denver
Made roster * Made at least one Pro Bowl during career

==== Undrafted free agents ====
2017 Cleveland Browns UDFA
Player	Position	College
B. J. Bello	LB	Illinois State
Donte Carey	S	Grand Valley State
Ladell Fleming	DE	Northern Illinois
J. D. Harmon	CB	Kentucky
Alvin Hill	CB	Maryland
Jamal Marcus	DE	Akron
Taylor McNamara	TE	USC
Najee Murray	CB	Kent State
Kai Nacua	S	BYU
Kenneth Olugbode	LB	Colorado
Karter Schult	DE	Northern Iowa
Channing Stribling	CB	Michigan

== Staff ==
2017 Cleveland Browns staff
Front office: Owners – Jimmy and Dee Haslam; Chief strategy officer – Paul DePodesta; General manager – John Dorsey; Vice president, player personnel – Andrew Berry; Vice president, player personnel – Ken Kovash; Senior football executive – Ryan Grigson; Director of football administration – Chris Cooper; Director of research & strategy – Kevin Meers; Director of player personnel – Chisolm Opara; Director of college scouting – Bobby Vega; Director of pro scouting – Dan Saganey; Director of scouting – Mike Cetta; Assistant director of scouting – Glenn Cook; Special advisor – Jim Brown; Head coaches: Head coach – Hue Jackson; Offensive coaches: Quarterbacks – David Lee; Run game coordinator/running backs – Kirby Wilson; Senior offensive assistant/wide receivers – Al Saunders; Tight ends – Greg Seamon; Offensive line – Bob Wylie; Assistant offensive line – Mark Hutson; Offensive quality control/assistant wide receivers – Bob Saunders	Defensive coaches: Defensive coordinator – Gregg Williams; Defensive line – Clyde Simmons; Assistant defensive line – Ken Delgado; Linebackers – Blake Williams; Defensive backs – DeWayne Walker; Assistant defensive backs – Jerod Kruse; Defensive quality control – Eric Sanders; Special teams coaches: Special teams coordinator – Chris Tabor; Special teams assistant – Shawn Mennenga; Special teams quality control – Stan Watson; Coaching assistant – Brian Braswell; Strength and conditioning: Director, high performance – Adam Beard; Strength and conditioning coordinator – Evan Marcus; Assistant strength and conditioning – Art Tolhurst; Sports scientist – Jamey Mroz

== Final roster ==
2017 Cleveland Browns roster
Quarterbacks (QB): 8 Kevin Hogan; 6 Cody Kessler; 7 DeShone Kizer; Running backs (RB): 34 Isaiah Crowell; 27 Matthew Dayes; 29 Duke Johnson; 40 Danny Vitale FB; 42 Marquez Williams FB; Wide receivers (WR): 10 Sammie Coates; 19 Corey Coleman; 12 Josh Gordon; 83 Matt Hazel; 81 Rashard Higgins; 80 Ricardo Louis; Tight ends (TE): 87 Seth DeValve; 89 Matt Lengel; 85 David Njoku; 86 Randall Telfer	Offensive linemen (OL): 77 Zach Banner T; 75 Joel Bitonio G; 72 Shon Coleman T; 66 Spencer Drango T; 79 Geoff Gray G; 63 Marcus Martin G; 62 Austin Reiter C; 64 JC Tretter C; 70 Kevin Zeitler G; Defensive linemen (DL): 99 Caleb Brantley DT; 93 Trevon Coley DT; 92 Lavar Edwards DE; 95 Myles Garrett DE; 94 Carl Nassib DE; 65 Larry Ogunjobi DT; 44 Nate Orchard DE; 55 Danny Shelton DT	Linebackers (LB): 50 B. J. Bello MLB; 52 James Burgess OLB; 48 Jeremy Cash OLB; 96 Josh Keyes OLB; 58 Christian Kirksey OLB; 53 Joe Schobert MLB; Defensive backs (DB): 20 Briean Boddy-Calhoun; 39 Justin Currie SS; 41 Mike Jordan CB; 30 Jason McCourty CB; 43 Kai Nacua FS; 22 Jabrill Peppers S; 35 C. J. Smith CB; 36 Derron Smith FS; 21 Jamar Taylor CB; Special teams (ST): 4 Britton Colquitt P; 5 Zane Gonzalez K; 47 Charley Hughlett LS	Practice squad: 88 C. J. Board WR; 57 Austin Calitro MLB; 60 Laurence Gibson T; 38 Jacob Hagen FS; 37 Trevon Hartfield SS; 84 Bug Howard WR; 97 T. Y. McGill DT; 33 Josh Rounds RB; 71 Victor Salako T; 82 Kasen Williams WR (IR); Reserve: 54 Dominique Alexander OLB (IR); 67 Chris Barker G (IR); 59 Tank Carder MLB (IR); 51 Jamie Collins OLB (IR); -- Darius Jackson RB (IR); 78 Roderick Johnson T (IR); 26 Derrick Kindred FS (IR); 98 Jamie Meder DT (IR); 90 Emmanuel Ogbah DE (IR); 31 Reggie Porter CB (IR); 73 Joe Thomas T (IR); 23 Howard Wilson CB (PUP); Rookies in italics 53 active, 13 reserve, 9 practice squad

== Preseason ==
Week	Date	Opponent	Result	Record	Game site	NFL.com recap
1	August 10	New Orleans Saints	W 20–14	1–0	FirstEnergy Stadium	Recap
2	August 21	New York Giants	W 10–6	2–0	FirstEnergy Stadium	Recap
3	August 26	at Tampa Bay Buccaneers	W 13–9	3–0	Raymond James Stadium	Recap
4	August 31	at Chicago Bears	W 25–0	4–0	Soldier Field	Recap

== Regular season ==
=== Schedule ===
The Browns began the season looking to improve on their 1–15 record from 2016. However, they instead became the second team to finish 0–16, after the 2008 Detroit Lions. The NFL expanded its schedule to 17 games in 2021, ensuring the 2017 Browns would be the final team to finish 0–16, and are still the most recent team to finish a full season winless. In the process, they extended a losing streak that began in Week 17 of last season (a later winless streak that continued until Week 3 of 2018). Many low points of the season include becoming the first team to finish consecutive seasons with 15 or more losses and start two or more consecutive seasons with 14 losses and a sputtering offense that only scored 20 or more points in only four of their 16 games. On December 7, 2017, general manager Sashi Brown was relieved of his duties, and was replaced by former Chiefs general manager John Dorsey. They were eliminated from AFC North contention with a Week 11 loss thus extending their streak without a division title to 25 seasons and were eliminated from playoff contention after a Week 12 loss, extending the postseason drought to 15 seasons. A Buffalo Bills victory over the Miami Dolphins coupled with a Ravens loss to the Bengals sent the Bills to the playoffs for the first time since 1999. As a result, the Browns would own the longest playoff drought in the NFL at the end of the season, with 2002 being their last playoff berth.

The Browns finished the season with a losing record for the 10th straight season, a franchise record. In addition to going winless at home since the first time since 1999, they extended their losing streak on the road to 21 games and their losing streak within their division to 17 games, both streaks that started in the 2015 season. A week 13 loss dropped the Browns to 1–27 in 28 games under Hue Jackson up to that point, over taking the 1976-77 Buccaneers for the worst 28-game start (2–26) in NFL history for a coaching regime, and the team would finish 1–31 in two seasons under Jackson, the worst 32 game stretch in NFL history. Since beginning the 2014 season with a 6–3 record prior to Week 11 of that season, the Browns lost 50 of 55 games between then and the end of 2017. Additionally, the Browns went on to lose 56 of their 64 games between Week 11 of 2014 (encompassing all of 2015, 2016 and 2017) and Week 9 of 2018 before going 5–2 to finish the 2018 season. This is at the time would be one of the worst 64-game stretches of any team in NFL history. To add insult to injury, offensive lineman Joe Thomas tore his triceps in a Week 7 loss to the Tennessee Titans, thus rending him out for the rest of the season. Prior to that, he had not missed a single offensive snap since joining the Browns in 2007. That Week 7 game turned out to be his last, as he would retire from the NFL on March 14, 2018.

Week	Date	Opponent	Result	Record	Game site	NFL.com recap
1	September 10	**Pittsburgh Steelers**	**L** 18–21	0–1	FirstEnergy Stadium	Recap
2	September 17	at **Baltimore Ravens**	**L** 10–24	0–2	M&T Bank Stadium	Recap
3	September 24	at Indianapolis Colts	**L** 28–31	0–3	Lucas Oil Stadium	Recap
4	October 1	**Cincinnati Bengals**	**L** 7–31	0–4	FirstEnergy Stadium	Recap
5	October 8	New York Jets	**L** 14–17	0–5	FirstEnergy Stadium	Recap
6	October 15	at Houston Texans	**L** 17–33	0–6	NRG Stadium	Recap
7	October 22	Tennessee Titans	**L** 9–12 (OT)	0–7	FirstEnergy Stadium	Recap
8	October 29	Minnesota Vikings	**L** 16–33	0–8	(United Kingdom) Twickenham Stadium (London)	Recap
9	Bye					
10	November 12	at Detroit Lions	**L** 24–38	0–9	Ford Field	Recap
11	November 19	Jacksonville Jaguars	**L** 7–19	0–10	FirstEnergy Stadium	Recap
12	November 26	at **Cincinnati Bengals**	**L** 16–30	0–11	Paul Brown Stadium	Recap
13	December 3	at Los Angeles Chargers	**L** 10–19	0–12	StubHub Center	Recap
14	December 10	Green Bay Packers	**L** 21–27 (OT)	0–13	FirstEnergy Stadium	Recap
15	December 17	**Baltimore Ravens**	**L** 10–27	0–14	FirstEnergy Stadium	Recap
16	December 24	at Chicago Bears	**L** 3–20	0–15	Soldier Field	Recap
17	December 31	at **Pittsburgh Steelers**	**L** 24–28	0–16	Heinz Field	Recap

Note: Intra-division opponents are in bold text.

=== Game summaries ===
==== Week 1: vs. Pittsburgh Steelers ====
Week One: Pittsburgh Steelers at Cleveland Browns – Game summary

Quarter	1	2	3	4	Total
**Steelers**	7	7	7	0	**21**
Browns	7	0	3	8	**18**

at FirstEnergy Stadium, Cleveland, Ohio

- Date: September 10
- Game time: 1:00 p.m. EDT
- Game weather: 63 °F (17 °C), sunny
- Game attendance: 67,431
- Referee: Craig Wrolstad
- TV announcers (CBS): Greg Gumbel, Trent Green and Jamie Erdahl
- Recap, Gamebook

Game information

**First quarter**

- PIT – Britton Colquitt punt blocked by Tyler Matakevich, ball recovered in CLE end zone by Anthony Chickillo for touchdown (Chris Boswell kick), 12:44. Steelers 7–0.
- CLE – DeShone Kizer 1-yard run (Zane Gonzalez kick), 0:24. Tied 7–7. **Drive: 12 plays, 68 yards, 5:26.**

**Second quarter**

- PIT – Jesse James 4-yard pass from Ben Roethlisberger (Chris Boswell kick), 0:49. Steelers 14–7. **Drive: 7 plays, 91 yards, 3:08.**

**Third quarter**

- CLE – Zane Gonzalez 24-yard field goal, 9:31. Steelers 14–10. **Drive: 7 plays, 53 yards, 4:29.**
- PIT – Jesse James 2-yard pass from Ben Roethlisberger (Chris Boswell kick), 5:43. Steelers 21–10. **Drive: 6 plays, 75 yards, 3:50.**

**Fourth quarter**

- CLE – Corey Coleman 3-yard pass from DeShone Kizer (Isaiah Crowell run), 3:40. Steelers 21–18. **Drive: 8 plays, 73 yards, 3:05.**

**Top passers**

- PIT – Ben Roethlisberger – 24/36, 263 yards, 2 TD, INT
- CLE – DeShone Kizer – 20/30, 222 yards, TD, INT

**Top rushers**

- PIT – Le'Veon Bell – 10 rushes, 32 yards
- CLE – Isaiah Crowell – 17 rushes, 33 yards

**Top receivers**

- PIT – Antonio Brown – 11 receptions, 182 yards
- CLE – Corey Coleman – 5 receptions, 53 yards, TD

**Top tacklers**

- PIT – Ryan Shazier – 4 tackles, 3 assists
- CLE – Joe Schobert – 4 tackles, 5 assists

The Browns dropped their 13th consecutive season-opening game with a 21–18 loss to the Steelers.

The scoring began early in the first quarter when Pittsburgh's Tyler Matakevich blocked a Britton Colquitt punt, knocking the ball into the end zone where it was recovered by Anthony Chickillo for a touchdown. The Browns were able to tie the score by the end of the first quarter, however, as rookie quarterback DeShone Kizer orchestrated a 12-play drive that ended when he scored on a 1-yard touchdown run.

The game stayed at 7–7 through most of the second quarter, until the Steelers quarterback Ben Roethlisberger connected with tight end Jesse James on a 4-yard touchdown with 45 seconds left in the first half. The 7–play, 91-yard scoring drive was highlighted by a 50-yard reception by Antonio Brown on a tipped ball.

After a Zane Gonzalez field goal brought the Browns within 14–10 early in the third quarter, the Steelers drove down the field again. Roethlisberger threw a second touchdown pass to James to put them up by 11, 21–10. The drive was boosted by a 41-yard pass interference penalty on Browns cornerback Jamar Taylor on a deep pass intended for Brown.

The score remained 21–10 until under four minutes remained in the game, when Kizer was able to throw his first career touchdown pass to Corey Coleman. A two–point conversion run by Isaiah Crowell brought the Browns to within a field goal, 21–18.

The Browns did not get a chance to score again, however, as the Steelers were able to run out the clock after a long pass from Roethlisberger to Brown. Browns head coach Hue Jackson challenged the ruling; however, the catch call on the field was upheld.

With their 13th straight season–opening loss, which extended an NFL record, the Browns started 0–1. The Browns also lost their 12th straight game against a divisional opponent.

==== Week 2: at Baltimore Ravens ====
Week Two: Cleveland Browns at Baltimore Ravens – Game summary

Quarter	1	2	3	4	Total
Browns	0	7	3	0	**10**
**Ravens**	7	14	0	3	**24**

at M&T Bank Stadium, Baltimore, Maryland

- Date: September 17
- Game time: 1:00 pm. EDT
- Game weather: 80 °F (27 °C), mostly cloudy
- Game attendance: 70,605
- Referee: Gene Steratore
- TV announcers (CBS): Andrew Catalon, James Lofton and Steve Tasker
- Recap, Gamebook

Game information

**First quarter**

- BAL – Terrance West 4-yard run (Justin Tucker kick), 3:56. Ravens 7–0. **Drive: 7 plays, 33 yards, 3:34.**

**Second quarter**

- BAL – Javorius Allen 9-yard pass from Joe Flacco (Justin Tucker kick), 7:17. Ravens 14–0. **Drive: 6 plays, 64 yards, 3:26.**
- CLE – David Njoku 23-yard pass from Kevin Hogan (Zane Gonzalez kick), 4:56. Ravens 14–7. **Drive: 5 plays, 83 yards, 2:21.**
- BAL – Jeremy Maclin 2-yard pass from Joe Flacco (Justin Tucker kick), 0:01. Ravens 21–7. **Drive: 3 plays, 40 yards, 0:18.**

**Third quarter**

- CLE – Zane Gonzalez 38-yard field goal, 9:24. Ravens 21–10. **Drive: 8 plays, 62 yards, 2:48.**

**Fourth quarter**

- BAL – Justin Tucker 28-yard field goal, 15:00. Ravens 24–10. **Drive: 11 plays, 53 yards, 6:19.**

**Top passers**

- CLE – DeShone Kizer – 15/31, 182 yards, 3 INT
- BAL – Joe Flacco – 25/34, 217 yards, 2 TD, INT

**Top rushers**

- CLE – Isaiah Crowell – 10 rushes, 37 yards
- BAL – Javorius Allen – 14 rushes, 66 yards

**Top receivers**

- CLE – Rashard Higgins – 7 receptions, 95 yards
- BAL – Benjamin Watson – 8 receptions, 91 yards

**Top tacklers**

- CLE – Jamar Taylor – 8 tackles, 1 assist
- BAL – C. J. Mosley – 8 tackles, 2 assists

After losing at home, the Browns traveled to Baltimore to play the Ravens. The Ravens scored the only points of the first quarter when Terrence West ran for a 4-yard touchdown to make it 7–0. They made it 14–0 in the second quarter when Javorius Allen caught a 9-yard pass from Joe Flacco. The Browns got on the board when Kevin Hogan found David Njoku on a 23-yard pass to make it 14–7. The Ravens then moved up by 2 touchdowns at halftime when Flacco found Jeremy Maclin on a 2-yard pass to make it 21–7. In the third quarter, the Browns drew closer when Zane Gonzalez kicked a 38-yard field goal to make it 21–10. In the fourth quarter, the Ravens sealed the game with a field goal of their own: Justin Tucker kicked it from 28 yards out to make the final score 24–10.

With the loss, the Browns fell to 0–2. Ravens QB Joe Flacco improved to 16–2 against the Browns for his career while the Browns lost their 14th straight road game and 13th straight game against a divisional opponent.

==== Week 3: at Indianapolis Colts ====
Week Three: Cleveland Browns at Indianapolis Colts – Game summary

Quarter	1	2	3	4	Total
Browns	0	14	0	14	**28**
**Colts**	7	21	0	3	**31**

at Lucas Oil Stadium, Indianapolis, Indiana

- Date: September 24
- Game time: 1:00 pm. EDT
- Game weather: Played indoors (retractable roof closed)
- Game attendance: 63,351
- Referee: Ed Hochuli
- TV announcers (CBS): Beth Mowins and Jay Feely
- Recap, Gamebook

Game information

**First quarter**

- IND – Jacoby Brissett 5-yard run (Adam Vinatieri kick), 0:24. Colts 7–0. **Drive: 10 plays, 70 yards, 4:13.**

**Second quarter**

- CLE – Duke Johnson 19-yard run (Zane Gonzalez kick), 13:22. Tied 7–7. **Drive: 5 plays, 75 yards, 2:02.**
- IND – Jacoby Brissett 7-yard run (Adam Vinatieri kick), 10:06. Colts 14–7. **Drive: 6 plays, 75 yards, 3:16.**
- IND – T. Y. Hilton 61-yard pass from Jacoby Brissett (Adam Vinatieri kick), 5:14. Colts 21–7. **Drive: 5 plays, 97 yards, 1:57.**
- IND – Frank Gore 4-yard run (Adam Vinatieri kick), 2:41. Colts 28–7. **Drive: 3 plays, 45 yards, 1:26.**
- CLE – David Njoku 1-yard pass from DeShone Kizer (Zane Gonzalez kick), 0:27. Colts 28–14. **Drive: 10 plays, 75 yards, 2:14.**

**Third quarter**

- No scoring plays

**Fourth quarter**

- IND – Adam Vinatieri 33-yard field goal, 10:18. Colts 31–14. **Drive: 10 plays, 34 yards, 4:53.**
- CLE – Kenny Britt 11-yard pass from DeShone Kizer (Zane Gonzalez kick), 6:56. Colts 31–21. **Drive: 5 plays, 58 yards, 1:52.**
- CLE – DeShone Kizer 1-yard run (Zane Gonzalez kick), 2:04. Colts 31–28. **Drive: 11 plays, 70 yards, 2:01.**

**Top passers**

- CLE – DeShone Kizer – 22/47, 242 yards, 2 TD, 3 INT
- IND – Jacoby Brissett – 17/24, 259 yards, TD

**Top rushers**

- CLE – DeShone Kizer – 7 carries, 44 yards, TD
- IND – Frank Gore – 25 carries, 57 yards, TD

**Top receivers**

- CLE – Duke Johnson – 6 receptions, 81 yards
- IND – T. Y. Hilton – 7 receptions, 153 yards, TD

' **Top tacklers**

- CLE – Joe Schobert - 5 tackles, 3 assists
- IND – Jon Bostic - 8 tackles, 2 assists

The Browns were a Vegas road favorite for the first time since 2012 and an overall favorite for the first time since 2015. The Colts struck first in the first quarter when backup QB Jacoby Brissett ran for a 5-yard touchdown to make the score 7–0 for the quarter's only points. The Browns managed to tie it up in the second quarter when Duke Johnson Jr. ran for a 19-yard touchdown to make it 7–7. Though the Colts then responded with 3 straight touchdowns: Brissett ran for another one from 7 yards out followed up by a 61-yard passing touchdown from him to T.Y. Hilton. Lastly, the Frank Gore ran for a 4-yard touchdown for lead changes of 14–7, 21–7, and 28–7. The Browns managed to make the score 28–14 at halftime when DeShone Kizer found David Njoku on a 1-yard pass. After a scoreless third quarter, the Colts managed to increase their lead when Adam Vinatieri nailed a 33-yard field goal to make it 31–14. The Browns tried to rally with 2 more touchdowns: Kizer connected with Kenny Britt on an 11-yard pass to make it 31–21. This was followed by Kizer running for a touchdown from a yard out to make it 31–28. The Browns failed to recover the onside kick and it sealed the win for the Colts.

With the loss, the Browns fell to 0–3.

==== Week 4: vs. Cincinnati Bengals ====
Week Four: Cincinnati Bengals at Cleveland Browns – Game summary

Quarter	1	2	3	4	Total
**Bengals**	0	21	10	0	**31**
Browns	0	0	0	7	**7**

at FirstEnergy Stadium, Cleveland, Ohio

- Date: October 1
- Game time: 1:00 pm. EDT
- Game weather: 63 °F (17 °C), sunny
- Game attendance: 67,431
- Referee: Ronald Torbert
- TV announcers (CBS): Spero Dedes and Adam Archuleta
- Recap, Gamebook

Game information

**First quarter**

- No scoring plays.

**Second quarter**

- CIN – A. J. Green 7-yard pass from Andy Dalton (Randy Bullock kick), 15:00. Bengals 7–0. **Drive: 9 plays, 35 yards, 5:21.**
- CIN – Tyler Kroft 3-yard pass from Andy Dalton (Randy Bullock kick), 2:36. Bengals 14–0. **Drive: 13 plays, 88 yards, 7:28.**
- CIN – Giovani Bernard 61-yard pass from Andy Dalton (Randy Bullock kick), 1:21. Bengals 21–0. **Drive: 3 plays, 83 yards, 0:53.**

**Third quarter**

- CIN – Randy Bullock 41-yard field goal, 11:32. Bengals 24–0. **Drive: 10 plays, 52 yards, 3:32.**
- CIN – Tyler Kroft 16-yard pass from Andy Dalton (Randy Bullock kick), 3:42. Bengals 31–0. **Drive: 10 plays, 83 yards, 6:20.**

**Fourth quarter**

- CLE – Duke Johnson 1-yard run (Zane Gonzalez kick), 1:56. Bengals 31–7. **Drive: 12 plays, 63 yards, 4:36.**

**Top passers**

- CIN – Andy Dalton – 25/30, 286 yards, 4 TD
- CLE – DeShone Kizer – 16/34, 118 yards, INT

**Top rushers**

- CIN – Andy Dalton – 4 rushes, 29 yards
- CLE – Isaiah Crowell – 7 rushes, 20 yards

**Top receivers**

- CIN – Tyler Kroft – 6 receptions, 68 yards, 2 TD
- CLE – Ricardo Louis – 5 receptions, 64 yards

**Top tacklers**

- CIN – Nick Vigil - 7 tackles, 4 assists
- CLE – Jason McCourty - 7 tackles

The Browns then returned for a game against their division rival Bengals in Game 1 of the Battle of Ohio. After a scoreless first quarter, the Bengals offense exploded in the second quarter with 3 touchdowns: Dalton threw all 3 when he found A.J. Green on a 7-yard pass, Tyler Kroft on a 3-yard pass, and Giovani Bernard on a 61-yard pass to make the score 7–0, 14–0, and 21–0 at halftime. In the third quarter, the Bengals increased their lead when Randy Bullock kicked a 41-yard field goal to make it 24–0. This was followed by Dalton's fourth touchdown pass of the game: Another one to Kroft from 16 yards out made it 31–0. The Browns scored their only points of the game in the fourth quarter when Duke Johnson Jr. ran for a 1-yard touchdown to make the final score 31–7.

With the loss, the Browns fell to 0–4 and had sole possession of last place in the AFC North. The loss also was their 14th straight against a divisional opponent.

==== Week 5: vs. New York Jets ====
Week Five: New York Jets at Cleveland Browns – Game summary

Quarter	1	2	3	4	Total
**Jets**	0	3	7	7	**17**
Browns	0	0	7	7	**14**

at FirstEnergy Stadium, Cleveland, Ohio

- Date: October 8
- Game time: 1:00 pm. EDT
- Game weather: 67 °F (19 °C), cloudy
- Game attendance: 62,032
- Referee: Walt Anderson
- TV announcers (Fox): Sam Rosen, Ronde Barber and Kristina Pink
- Recap, Gamebook

Game information

**First quarter**

- No scoring plays.

**Second quarter**

- NYJ – Chandler Catanzaro 57-yard field goal, 0:01. Jets 3–0. **Drive: 6 plays, 32 yards, 0:31.**

**Third quarter**

- CLE – David Njoku 21-yard pass from Kevin Hogan (Zane Gonzalez kick), 9:29. Browns 7–3. **Drive: 10 plays, 75 yards, 5:37.**
- NYJ – Austin Seferian-Jenkins 2-yard pass from Josh McCown (Chandler Catanzaro kick), 4:21. Jets 10–7. **Drive: 2 plays, 13 yards, 0:41.**

**Fourth quarter**

- NYJ – Jermaine Kearse 24-yard pass from Josh McCown (Chandler Catanzaro kick), 8:35. Jets 17–7. **Drive: 8 plays, 97 yards, 4:26.**
- CLE – Duke Johnson 41-yard pass from Kevin Hogan (Zane Gonzalez kick), 2:00. Jets 17–14. **Drive: 5 plays, 86 yards, 1:34.**

**Top passers**

- NYJ – Josh McCown – 23/30, 194 yards, 2 TD, INT
- CLE – Kevin Hogan – 16/19, 194 yards, 2 TD, INT

**Top rushers**

- NYJ – Elijah McGuire – 11 rushes, 20 yards
- CLE – Isaiah Crowell – 16 rushes, 60 yards

**Top receivers**

- NYJ – Jeremy Kerley – 4 receptions, 39 yards
- CLE – Ricardo Louis – 5 receptions, 71 yards

**Top tacklers**

- NYJ – Morris Claiborne 8 tackles, 1 assist
- CLE – Jamar Taylor and James Burgess - 5 tackles each

After a horrifying loss, the Browns stayed home for a game against the Jets. After a scoreless first quarter, the Jets managed to score the first half's only points when Chandler Catanzaro nailed a 57-yard field goal to make it 3–0 at halftime. The Browns managed to take the lead in the third quarter when Kevin Hogan found David Njoku on a 21-yard pass to make it 7–3. The Jets however retook the lead later on in the quarter when Josh McCown found Austin Seferian-Jenkins to make it 10–7. They increased their lead in the fourth quarter when McCown found Jermaine Kearse on a 24-yard pass to make it 17–7. The Browns came up short when Hogan found Duke Johnson Jr. on a 41-yard pass to make the final score 17–14. The Browns missed 2 field goals, had 3 turnovers, and were 0/3 in the red zone.

With the loss, the Browns fell to 0–5. They were the only team in the AFC without a victory through five weeks of the season.

==== Week 6: at Houston Texans ====
Week Six: Cleveland Browns at Houston Texans – Game summary

Quarter	1	2	3	4	Total
Browns	3	0	0	14	**17**
**Texans**	10	14	9	0	**33**

at NRG Stadium, Houston, Texas

- Date: October 15
- Game time: 1:00 pm. EDT/12:00 p.m. CDT
- Game weather: Played indoors (retractable roof closed)
- Game attendance: 71,815
- Referee: Brad Allen
- TV announcers (CBS): Andrew Catalon and James Lofton
- Recap, Gamebook

Game information

**First quarter**

- HOU – Kaʻimi Fairbairn 40-yard field goal, 10:57. Texans 3–0. **Drive: 10 plays, 52 yards, 4:03.**
- CLE – Zane Gonzalez 41-yard field goal, 3:15. Tied 3–3. **Drive: 4 plays, 4 yards, 1:34.**
- HOU – Will Fuller 39-yard pass from Deshaun Watson (Kaʻimi Fairbairn kick), 0:41. Texans 10–3. **Drive: 5 plays, 87 yards, 2:34.**

**Second quarter**

- HOU – Johnathan Joseph 82-yard interception return (kick failed), 11:08. Texans 16–3. **Drive: 9 plays, 53 yards, 4:33.**
- HOU – Braxton Miller 1-yard pass from Deshaun Watson (Ryan Griffin pass), 4:05. Texans 24–3. **Drive: 6 plays, 71 yards, 2:49.**

**Third quarter**

- HOU – Penalty on Kevin Hogan enforced in the end zone for a safety, 10:10. Texans 26–3. **Drive: 3 plays, −3 yards, 1:28.**
- HOU – DeAndre Hopkins 3-yard pass from Deshaun Watson (Kaʻimi Fairbairn kick), 4:05. Texans 33–3. **Drive: 13 plays, 65 yards, 6:05.**

**Fourth quarter**

- CLE – Jason McCourty 56-yard interception return (Zane Gonzalez kick), 13:27. Texans 33–10. **Drive: 4 plays, 21 yards, 1:53.**
- CLE – Seth DeValve 3-yard pass from Kevin Hogan (Zane Gonzalez kick), 1:03. Texans 33–17. **Drive: 4 plays, 50 yards, 0:46.**

**Top passers**

- CLE – Kevin Hogan – 20/37, 140 yards, TD, 3 INT
- HOU – Deshaun Watson – 17/29, 225 yards, 3 TD, INT

**Top rushers**

- CLE – Isaiah Crowell – 12 carries, 58 yards
- HOU – D'Onta Foreman – 12 carries, 59 yards

**Top receivers**

- CLE – Kasen Williams – 4 receptions, 41 yards
- HOU – Will Fuller – 2 receptions, 62 yards, TD

**Top tacklers**

- CLE – Joe Schobert - 5 tackles, 7 assists
- HOU – Benardrick McKinney - 7 tackles, 1 assist

The Browns traveled for a duel against the Texans. The Texans scored first when Kaʻimi Fairbairn kicked a 40-yard field goal to make it 3–0. The Browns tied the game up when Zane Gonzalez kicked a 41-yard field goal making the score 3–3. Afterwards, the Texans scored 30 unanswered points: Later in the first quarter, DeShaun Watson found Will Fuller V on a 39-yard pass to make it 10–3. In the second quarter, Johnathan Joseph returned an interception 82 yards for a touchdown to make it 16–3 followed up by Watson connecting with Braxton Miller on a 1-yard pass to make it 24–3 at halftime. In the third quarter, a penalty got enforced on Kevin Hogan in the end zone giving the Texans a safety and increasing their lead to 26–3. Watson then found DeAndre Hopkins on a 3-yard pass to make it 33–3. The Browns scored twice in the fourth quarter when Jason McCourty returned an interception 56 yards for a touchdown to make it 33–10. Finally, Hogan for Seth DeValve on a 3-yard pass to make the final score 33–17.

The Texans routed the Browns, dropping them to 0–6.

==== Week 7: vs. Tennessee Titans ====
Week Seven: Tennessee Titans at Cleveland Browns – Game summary

Quarter	1	2	3	4	OT	Total
**Titans**	3	3	0	3	3	**12**
Browns	0	3	3	3	0	**9**

at FirstEnergy Stadium, Cleveland, Ohio

- Date: October 22
- Game time: 1:00 pm. EDT
- Game weather: 74 °F (23 °C), sunny
- Game attendance: 59,061
- Referee: Terry McAulay
- TV announcers (CBS): Spero Dedes and Adam Archuleta
- Recap, Gamebook

Game information

**First quarter**

- TEN – Ryan Succop 43-yard field goal, 8:38. Titans 3–0. **Drive: 11 plays, 45 yards, 6:22.**

**Second quarter**

- CLE – Zane Gonzalez 31-yard field goal, 8:31. Tied 3–3. **Drive: 7 plays, 27 yards, 3:40.**
- TEN – Ryan Succop 23-yard field goal, 1:37. Titans 6–3. **Drive: 14 plays, 70 yards, 6:54.**

**Third quarter**

- CLE – Zane Gonzalez 47-yard field goal, 4:25. Tied 6–6. **Drive: 10 plays, 70 yards, 5:07.**

**Fourth quarter**

- TEN – Ryan Succop 46-yard field goal, 14:50. Titans 9–6. **Drive: 9 plays, 47 yards, 4:35.**
- CLE – Zane Gonzalez 54-yard field goal, 0:47. Tied 9–9. **Drive: 10 plays, 31 yards, 3:30.**

**Overtime**

- TEN – Ryan Succop 47-yard field goal, 2:00. Titans 12–9. **Drive: 7 plays, 20 yards, 5:57.**

**Top passers**

- TEN – Marcus Mariota – 21/34, 203 yards
- CLE – Cody Kessler – 10/19, 121 yards, INT

**Top rushers**

- TEN – DeMarco Murray – 18 rushes, 59 yards
- CLE – Isaiah Crowell – 17 rushes, 35 yards

**Top receivers**

- TEN – Delanie Walker – 7 receptions, 63 yards
- CLE – Duke Johnson – 6 receptions, 45 yards

**Top tacklers**

- TEN - Avery Williamson - 6 tackles, 8 assists
- CLE - Christian Kirksey - 8 tackles, 9 assists

The Browns then returned home for a game against the Titans. In a highly defensive battle of no touchdowns, the Titans scored first when Ryan Succop kicked a 41-yard field goal to make it 3–0. The Browns tied it up when Zane Gonzalez kicked a 31-yard field goal to make it 3–3. The Titans retook the lead with Succop's 23-yard field goal to make it 6–3 at halftime. The Browns then tied it up when Zane Gonzalez nailed 47-yard field goal to make it 6–6 for the only points in the third quarter. The Titans then moved ahead in the fourth quarter after Succop kicked another field goal from 46 yards out to make it 9–6. The Browns forced overtime when Gonzalez nailed a 54-yard field goal to make it 9–9. In overtime, the Titans scored the eventual game-winning field goal when Succop nailed it from 47 yards out to make the final score 12–9.

With the loss, the Browns fell to 0–7. The loss led to the Browns starting 0–7 for only the 4th time in franchise history (1975, 1999, and 2016). It was the first time in 23 games under Hue Jackson that the Browns failed to score a touchdown. During the third quarter, ten-time Pro Bowl left tackle Joe Thomas suffered an injury to his arm and was knocked out of the rest of the game, making this the first time since joining the Browns in 2007 that he had missed an offensive play. The day after the game, it was announced that Thomas had torn his triceps and would likely miss the rest of the season. It turned out to be his last NFL game, as Thomas announced his retirement on March 14, 2018.

==== Week 8: vs. Minnesota Vikings ====
NFL London Games

Week Eight: Minnesota Vikings at Cleveland Browns – Game summary

Quarter	1	2	3	4	Total
**Vikings**	3	9	11	10	**33**
Browns	6	7	3	0	**16**

at Twickenham Stadium, London, England

- Date: October 29
- Game time: 1:30 p.m. GMT/9:30 am. EDT
- Game weather: 56 °F (13 °C), partly cloudy
- Game attendance: 74,237
- Referee: Jeff Triplette
- TV announcers (NFLN): Greg Gumbel, Trent Green and Jamie Erdahl
- Recap, Gamebook

Game information

First quarter

- CLE – Isaiah Crowell 26-yard run (kick failed, hit right upright), 11:20. Browns 6–0. **Drive: 2 plays, 37 yards, 0:29.**
- MIN – Kai Forbath 35-yard field goal, 5:27. Browns 6–3. **Drive: 7 plays, 18 yards, 3:26.**

Second quarter

- MIN – Adam Thielen 18-yard pass from Case Keenum (kick blocked), 2:48. Vikings 9–6. **Drive: 7 plays, 60 yards, 3:12.**
- CLE – DeShone Kizer 1-yard run (Zane Gonzalez kick), 0:40. Browns 13–9. **Drive: 8 plays, 82 yards, 2:08.**
- MIN – Kai Forbath 34-yard field goal, 0:00. Browns 13–12. **Drive: 6 plays, 62 yards, 0:40.**

Third quarter

- MIN – Kai Forbath 43-yard field goal, 13:32. Vikings 15–13. **Drive: 4 plays, 5 yards, 1:19.**
- CLE – Zane Gonzalez 23-yard field goal, 5:34. Browns 16–15. **Drive: 12 plays, 55 yards, 4:57.**
- MIN – Jerick McKinnon 1-yard run (Jerick McKinnon run), 1:16. Vikings 23–16. **Drive: 8 plays, 75 yards, 4:18.**

Fourth quarter

- MIN – Kyle Rudolph 4-yard pass from Case Keenum (Kai Forbath kick), 10:06. Vikings 30–16. **Drive: 9 plays, 84 yards, 4:47.**
- MIN – Kai Forbath 51-yard field goal, 1:09. Vikings 33–16. **Drive: 4 plays, −1 yard, 1:42.**

Top passers

- MIN – Case Keenum – 27/43, 288 yards, TD
- CLE – DeShone Kizer – 18/34, 179 yards

Top rushers

- MIN – Jerick McKinnon – 14 rushes, 50 yards, TD
- CLE – Isaiah Crowell – 11 rushes, 64 yards, TD

Top receivers

- MIN – Adam Thielen – 5 receptions, 98 yards, TD
- CLE – Isaiah Crowell – 4 receptions, 54 yards

**Top tacklers**

- MIN- Eric Kendricks - 8 tackles, 1 assist
- CLE- Joe Schobert - 11 tackles, 1 assist

The Browns traveled to London but were considered home team against the Vikings. They scored first in the first quarter when Isaiah Crowell ran for a 26-yard touchdown to make it 6–0. The Vikes got on the board when Kai Forbath kicked a 35-yard field goal to make it 6–3. The Vikings took the lead when Case Keenum found Adam Thielen on an 18-yard pass to make it 9–3. DeShone Kizer ran for a 1-yard touchdown to put the Browns back in the lead 13–9. Though, the Vikes soon followed when Forbath kicked a 34-yard field goal to make it 13–12 at halftime. In the third quarter, the Vikes retook the lead after Forbath kicked a 43-yard field goal to make it 15–13. Zane Gonzalez then put up a 23-yard field goal to make it 16–15 in favor of the Browns retaking the lead. It didn't last long, and the Vikings retook the lead later in the quarter when Jerick McKinnon ran for a 1-yard touchdown to make it 23–16. In the fourth quarter, the Vikes sealed the game when Keenum found Kyle Rudolph on a 4-yard pass to make it 30–16. Then Forbath kicked a 51-yard field goal to make the final score 33–16.

With the loss, the Browns went into their bye week 0–8.

==== Week 10: at Detroit Lions ====
Week Ten: Cleveland Browns at Detroit Lions – Game summary

Quarter	1	2	3	4	Total
Browns	10	0	14	0	**24**
**Lions**	3	14	7	14	**38**

at Ford Field, Detroit, Michigan

- Date: November 12
- Game time: 1:00 pm. EST
- Game weather: Played indoors (dome stadium)
- Game attendance: 64,646
- Referee: Carl Cheffers
- TV announcers (CBS): Spero Dedes and Adam Archuleta
- Recap, Gamebook

Game information

**First quarter**

- CLE – Zane Gonzalez 23-yard field goal. Browns 3–0. **Drive: 5 plays, 42 yards, 1:32.**
- CLE – Kenny Britt 19-yard pass from DeShone Kizer (Zane Gonzalez kick) Browns 10–0. **Drive: 3 plays, 31 yards, 1:23.**
- DET – Matt Prater 46-yard field goal. Browns 10–3. **Drive: 7 plays, 47 yards, 2:39.**

**Second quarter**

- DET – Ameer Abdullah 8-yard run (Matt Prater kick) Tied 10–10. **Drive: 8 plays, 90 yards, 4:28.**
- DET – Nevin Lawson 44-yard fumble return (Matt Prater kick) Lions 17–10. **Drive: 5 plays, 21 yards, 2:10.**

**Third quarter**

- CLE – Isaiah Crowell 6-yard run (Zane Gonzalez kick). Tied 17–17. **Drive: 8 plays, 85 yards, 3:59.**
- CLE – DeShone Kizer 1-yard run (Zane Gonzalez kick). Browns 24–17. **Drive: 10 plays, 80 yards, 6:01.**
- DET – Theo Riddick 8-yard pass from Matthew Stafford (Matt Prater kick) Tied 24–24. **Drive: 4 plays, 75 yards, 1:31.**

**Fourth quarter**

- DET – Eric Ebron 29-yard pass from Matthew Stafford (Matt Prater kick) Lions 31–24. **Drive: 9 plays, 61 yards, 4:03.**
- DET – Golden Tate 40-yard pass from Matthew Stafford (Matt Prater kick) Lions 38–24. **Drive: 3 plays, 44 yards, 0:49.**

**Top passers**

- CLE – DeShone Kizer – 21/37, 232 yards, TD, INT
- DET – Matthew Stafford – 17/26, 249 yards, 3 TD, INT

**Top rushers**

- CLE – Isaiah Crowell – 16 carries, 90 yards, TD
- DET – Ameer Abdullah – 11 carries, 52 yards, TD

**Top receivers**

- CLE – Seth DeValve – 4 receptions, 70 yards
- DET – Golden Tate – 6 receptions, 97 yards, TD

**Top tacklers**

- CLE – Christian Kirksey – 4 tackles, 3 assists
- DET – Tahir Whitehead – 7 tackles, 1 assist

Coming off of their bye week, the Browns traveled north to take on the Lions. The Browns scored first when Zane Gonzalez kicked a 23-yard field goal to make it 3–0. They made it 10–0 when DeShone Kizer found Kenny Britt on a 19-yard touchdown. The Lions then scored 17 straight points going into the second quarter: Starting with Matt Prater nailing a 46-yard field goal followed up by Ameer Abdullah running for an 8-yard touchdown, and finally Nevin Lawson returning a fumble 44 yards for a touchdown to take a 17–10 lead into halftime. In the third quarter, the Browns managed to retake the lead when Isaiah Crowell ran for a 6-yard touchdown followed up by Kizer running for a 1-yard touchdown made it 24–17. The lead was short-lived, as the Lions tied the game with under a minute to go in the quarter when Matthew Stafford found Theo Reddick on an 8-yard pass to tie the game back up 24–24. In the fourth quarter, the Lions were able to seal the game with 2 more touchdowns: Stafford found Eric Ebron on a 29-yard pass to retake the lead 31–24 and then found Golden Tate on a 40-yard pass to make the final score 38–24.

With the loss, the Browns fell to 0–9, clinching a losing record for the 10th consecutive season, extending their franchise record drought. The San Francisco 49ers' win over the New York Giants later that day left the Browns as the only winless team in the NFL through 10 weeks of the season.

==== Week 11: vs. Jacksonville Jaguars ====
Week Eleven: Jacksonville Jaguars at Cleveland Browns – Game summary

Quarter	1	2	3	4	Total
**Jaguars**	7	3	0	9	**19**
Browns	0	7	0	0	**7**

at FirstEnergy Stadium, Cleveland, Ohio

- Date: November 19
- Game time: 1:00 pm. EST
- Game weather: 38 °F (3 °C), cloudy
- Game attendance: 57,003
- Referee: Pete Morelli
- TV announcers (CBS): Andrew Catalon and James Lofton
- Recap, Gamebook

Game information

**First quarter**

- JAX – Marcedes Lewis 10-yard pass from Blake Bortles (Josh Lambo kick), 6:59. Jaguars 7–0. **Drive: 4 plays, 33 yards, 1:42.**

**Second quarter**

- JAX – Josh Lambo 38-yard field goal, 14:18. Jaguars 10–0. **Drive: 8 plays, 47 yards, 3:33.**
- CLE – Duke Johnson 27-yard pass from DeShone Kizer (Zane Gonzalez kick), 11:33. Jaguars 10–7. **Drive: 5 plays, 66 yards, 2:46.**

**Third quarter**

- No scoring plays

**Fourth quarter**

- JAX – Josh Lambo 39-yard field goal, 3:35. Jaguars 13–7. **Drive: 8 plays, 31 yards, 4:52.**
- JAX – Telvin Smith fumble recovery in end zone (run failed), 1:24. Jaguars 19–7.

**Top passers**

- JAX – Blake Bortles – 17/30, 154 yards, TD
- CLE – DeShone Kizer – 16/32, 179 yards, TD, 2 INT

**Top rushers**

- JAX – Leonard Fournette – 28 rushes, 111 yards
- CLE – DeShone Kizer – 5 rushes, 22 yards

**Top receivers**

- JAX – Marqise Lee – 5 receptions, 45 yards
- CLE – Corey Coleman – 6 receptions, 80 yards

**Top tacklers**

- JAX – Jalen Ramsey - 4 tackles, 2 assists
- CLE – Christian Kirksey - 8 tackles, 6 assists

The Browns returned home after a tough road loss to take on the Jaguars. The Jags scored first in the first quarter when Blake Bortles found Marcedes Lewis on a 10-yard pass to make it 7–0 for the quarter's only score. In the second quarter they made it 10–0 when Josh Lambo kicked a 38-yard field goal. The Browns got on the board when DeShone Kizer found Duke Johnson on a 27-yard pass to make it 10–7 at halftime. In the second half, it was all Jags after a scoreless third quarter as Lambo nailed a 39-yard field goal to make it 13–7 followed up by Telvin Smith recovering a fumble in the end zone for a touchdown (with a failed 2-point conversion) to make the final score 19–7. The Browns committed five turnovers, including two interceptions and two lost fumbles from Kizer.

With the loss, the Browns fell to 0–10. Combined with the Pittsburgh Steelers' victory the Browns were mathematically eliminated from AFC North contention, marking the 25th consecutive season the Browns did not win a division title.

==== Week 12: at Cincinnati Bengals ====
Week Twelve: Cleveland Browns at Cincinnati Bengals – Game summary

Quarter	1	2	3	4	Total
Browns	3	3	3	7	**16**
**Bengals**	7	9	7	7	**30**

at Paul Brown Stadium, Cincinnati, Ohio

- Date: November 26
- Game time: 1:00 pm. EST
- Game weather: 46 °F (8 °C), partly cloudy
- Game attendance: 51,710
- Referee: John Hussey
- TV announcers (CBS): Andrew Catalon and James Lofton
- Recap, Gamebook

Game information

**First quarter**

- CLE – Zane Gonzalez 27-yard field goal, 9:21. Browns 3–0. **Drive: 11 plays, 66 yards, 5:43.**
- CIN – Tyler Boyd 8-yard pass from Andy Dalton (Randy Bullock kick), 5:12. Bengals 7–3. **Drive: 9 plays, 75 yards, 4:09.**

**Second quarter**

- CIN – Randy Bullock 31-yard field goal, 9:17. Bengals 10–3. **Drive: 12 plays, 54 yards, 5:55.**
- CIN – Randy Bullock 49-yard field goal, 6:17. Bengals 13–3. **Drive: 5 plays, 18 yards, 1:19.**
- CIN – Randy Bullock 21-yard field goal, 2:10. Bengals 16–3. **Drive: 6 plays, 42 yards, 3:09.**
- CLE – Zane Gonzalez 21-yard field goal, 0:05. Bengals 16–6. **Drive: 11 plays, 75 yards, 2:06.**

**Third quarter**

- CIN – Tyler Kroft 1-yard pass from Andy Dalton (Randy Bullock kick), 10:26. Bengals 23–6. **Drive: 10 plays, 78 yards, 4:39.**
- CLE – Zane Gonzalez 39-yard field goal, 4:37. Bengals 23–9. **Drive: 10 plays, 59 yards, 5:48.**

**Fourth quarter**

- CLE – DeShone Kizer 3-yard run (Zane Gonzalez kick), 7:01. Bengals 23–16. **Drive: 15 plays, 89 yards, 5:29.**
- CIN – Joe Mixon 11-yard run (Randy Bullock kick), 3:02. Bengals 30–16. **Drive: 7 plays, 75 yards, 4:00.**

**Top passers**

- CLE – DeShone Kizer – 18/31, 268 yards
- CIN – Andy Dalton – 18/28, 214 yards, 2 TD

**Top rushers**

- CLE – Isaiah Crowell – 16 rushes, 95 yards
- CIN – Joe Mixon – 23 rushes, 114 yards, TD

**Top receivers**

- CLE – Corey Coleman – 3 receptions, 64 yards
- CIN – A. J. Green – 5 receptions, 66 yards

**Top tacklers**

- CLE – Joe Schobert - 10 tackles, 3 assists
- CIN – Dre Kirkpatrick - 7 tackles, 2 assists

The Browns then traveled to take on the Bengals in Game 2 of the Battle of Ohio. In the first quarter, the Browns took an early 3–0 lead when Zane Gonzalez kicked a 27-yard field goal, although the Bengals responded when Andy Dalton found Tyler Boyd on an 8-yard pass to make it 7–3, Bengals. In the second quarter, the Bengals increased their lead with 3 field goals kicked by Randy Bullock: from 31, 49, and 21 yards out, respectively, to make the score 10–3, 13–3, and 16–3. The Browns made it 16–6 before halftime when Gonzalez kicked a 21-yard field goal. The Bengals moved further ahead when Dalton found Tyler Kroft on a 1-yard pass to make it 23–6. The Browns came within 2 touchdowns when Gonzalez kicked his third field goal of the day from 39 yards out to make it 23–9 in the third quarter. In the fourth quarter, DeShone Kizer ran for a 3-yard touchdown to make it 23–16. However, it would not prove to be enough, as later on, the Bengals sealed the game when Joe Mixon ran for an 11-yard touchdown.

With the loss, the Browns fell to 0–11 and were eliminated from playoff contention for the 15th consecutive season.

==== Week 13: at Los Angeles Chargers ====
Week Thirteen: Cleveland Browns at Los Angeles Chargers – Game summary

Quarter	1	2	3	4	Total
Browns	0	7	0	3	**10**
**Chargers**	0	9	10	0	**19**

at StubHub Center, Carson, California

- Date: December 3
- Game time: 4:05 pm. EST/1:05 p.m. PST
- Game weather: 68 °F (20 °C), sunny
- Game attendance: 25,320
- Referee: Walt Coleman
- TV announcers (CBS): Spero Dedes and Adam Archuleta
- Recap, Gamebook

Game information

**First quarter**

- No scoring plays.

**Second quarter**

- LAC – Travis Coons 21-yard field goal, 9:03. Chargers 3–0. **Drive: 10 plays, 60 yards, 4:25.**
- LAC – Travis Coons 40-yard field goal, 3:45. Chargers 6–0. **Drive: 7 plays, 38 yards, 3:29.**
- CLE – David Njoku 28-yard pass from DeShone Kizer (Zane Gonzalez kick), 1:55. Browns 7–6. **Drive: 5 plays, 65 yards, 1:50.**
- LAC – Travis Coons 22-yard field goal, 0:00. Chargers 9–7. **Drive: 11 plays, 75 yards, 1:55.**

**Third quarter**

- LAC – Keenan Allen 7-yard pass from Philip Rivers (Travis Coons kick), 10:35. Chargers 16–7. **Drive: 10 plays, 78 yards, 4:25.**
- LAC – Travis Coons 27-yard field goal, 1:02. Chargers 19–7. **Drive: 12 plays, 66 yards, 7:03.**

**Fourth quarter**

- CLE – Zane Gonzalez 35-yard field goal, 12:03. Chargers 19–10. **Drive: 11 plays, 58 yards, 3:59.**

**Top passers**

- CLE – DeShone Kizer – 15/32, 215 yards, TD, INT
- LAC – Philip Rivers – 31/43, 344 yards, TD

**Top rushers**

- CLE – DeShone Kizer – 5 carries, 46 yards
- LAC – Melvin Gordon – 19 carries, 77 yards

**Top receivers**

- CLE – Josh Gordon – 4 receptions, 85 yards
- LAC – Keenan Allen – 10 receptions, 105 yards, TD

**Top tacklers**

- CLE – Jason McCourty - 9 tackles
- LAC – Joey Bosa - 7 tackles

The Browns then traveled further west to take on the Chargers, the only team the Browns beat the previous season. After a scoreless first quarter, Travis Coons kicked two field goals for the Chargers, from 21 and 40 yards, for a 6–0 lead. The Browns countered when DeShone Kizer found David Njoku on a 28-yard pass to make it 7–6. The Chargers moved back into the lead when Coons kicked his third field goal of the day from 22 yards out to make it 9–7 at halftime. In the third quarter however, the Chargers managed to increase their lead when Philip Rivers found Keenan Allen on a 7-yard pass to make it 16–7. This was followed by Coons' fourth field goal, from 27 yards, to put his team up 19–7. The Browns scored their only points in the half during the fourth quarter when Zane Gonzalez kicked a 35-yard field goal, making the final score 19–10.

With the loss, the Browns fell to 0–12. The loss made the Browns 1–27 in the first 28 games under Jackson and Brown, overtaking the 1976–1977 Buccaneers (2–26) for the worst 28 game start under a head coach and general manager in NFL history.

On December 7, Sashi Brown was fired as general manager. Hours later, the Browns announced former Kansas City Chiefs general manager John Dorsey as their new general manager.

==== Week 14: vs. Green Bay Packers ====
Week Fourteen: Green Bay Packers at Cleveland Browns – Game summary

Quarter	1	2	3	4	OT	Total
**Packers**	7	0	0	14	6	**27**
Browns	7	7	7	0	0	**21**

at FirstEnergy Stadium, Cleveland, Ohio

- Date: December 10
- Game time: 1:00 pm. EST
- Game weather: 29 °F (−2 °C), cloudy
- Game attendance: 67,431
- Referee: Bill Vinovich
- TV announcers (Fox): Thom Brennaman, Chris Spielman and Peter Schrager
- Recap, Gamebook

Game information

First quarter

- GB – Jamaal Williams 30-yard pass from Brett Hundley (Mason Crosby kick), 8:57. Packers 7–0. **Drive: 11 plays, 74 yards, 6:10.**
- CLE – Josh Gordon 18-yard pass from DeShone Kizer (Zane Gonzalez kick), 10:47. Tied 7–7. **Drive: 7 plays, 84 yards, 4:05.**

Second quarter

- CLE – Duke Johnson 7-yard pass from DeShone Kizer (Zane Gonzalez kick), 5:16. Browns 14–7. **Drive: 12 plays, 70 yards, 6:58.**

Third quarter

- CLE – Corey Coleman 2-yard pass from DeShone Kizer (Zane Gonzalez kick), 2:59. Browns 21–7. **Drive: 9 plays, 88 yards, 4:31.**

Fourth quarter

- GB – Jamaal Williams 1-yard run (Mason Crosby kick), 12:54. Browns 21–14. **Drive: 13 plays, 75 yards, 4:59.**
- GB – Davante Adams 1-yard pass from Brett Hundley (Mason Crosby kick), 0:17. Tied 21–21. **Drive: 7 plays, 25 yards, 2:20.**

Overtime

- GB – Davante Adams 25-yard pass from Brett Hundley, 5:12. Packers 27–21. **Drive: 6 plays, 42 yards, 3:23.**

Top passers

- GB – Brett Hundley – 35/46, 265 yards, 3 TD
- CLE – DeShone Kizer – 20/28, 214 yards, 3 TD, 2 INT

Top rushers

- GB – Jamaal Williams – 15 rushes, 49 yards, TD
- CLE – Isaiah Crowell – 19 rushes, 121 yards

Top receivers

- GB – Davante Adams – 10 receptions, 84 yards, 2 TD
- CLE – Josh Gordon – 3 receptions, 69 yards, TD

**Top tacklers**

- GB – HaHa Clinton-Dix, Blake Martinez, and Jake Ryan - 4 tackles each
- CLE – Jason McCourty - 8 tackles, 2 assists

The Browns returned home to take on the Packers and their backup QB Brett Hundley. In the first quarter, the Packers took an early lead when Hundley found Jamaal Williams on a 30-yard pass to make it 7–0. The Browns tied the game up later on in the quarter when DeShone Kizer found Josh Gordon on an 18-yard pass to make it 7–7. In the second quarter, the Browns moved into the lead when Kizer connected with Duke Johnson Jr. on a 7-yard pass to make it 14–7 at halftime. In the third quarter, the Browns moved ahead by 2 touchdowns when Kizer found Corey Coleman on a 2-yard pass to make it 21–7. In the fourth quarter however, the Packers managed to tie it up when Jamaal Williams ran for a 1-yard touchdown followed up by Hundley connecting with Davante Adams on a 1-yard pass to make it 21–14 then 21–21 to force overtime.

In overtime, Cleveland won the toss but Kizer threw an interception to Packers rookie safety Josh Jones. Adams later scored on a 25-yard touchdown pass from Hundley to seal a 27–21 Green Bay win.

With the loss, the Browns dropped to 0–13. They became the first franchise in NFL history to start 0–13 in consecutive seasons.

==== Week 15: vs. Baltimore Ravens ====
Week Fifteen: Baltimore Ravens at Cleveland Browns – Game summary

Quarter	1	2	3	4	Total
**Ravens**	3	14	10	0	**27**
Browns	0	10	0	0	**10**

at FirstEnergy Stadium, Cleveland, Ohio

- Date: December 17
- Game time: 1:00 pm. EST
- Game weather: 36 °F (2 °C), cloudy
- Game attendance: 56,434
- Referee: Clete Blakeman
- TV announcers (CBS): Tom McCarthy, Steve Beuerlein, Steve Tasker and Melanie Collins
- Recap, Gamebook

Game information

**First quarter**

- BAL – Justin Tucker 31-yard field goal, 8:46. Ravens 3–0. **Drive: 13 plays, 62 yards, 6:14.**

**Second quarter**

- CLE – Duke Johnson 12-yard run (Zane Gonzalez kick), 8:12. Browns 7–3. **Drive: 5 plays, 96 yards, 2:59.**
- BAL – Joe Flacco 2-yard run (Justin Tucker kick), 3:01. Ravens 10–7. **Drive: 11 plays, 75 yards, 5:11.**
- BAL – Benjamin Watson 33-yard pass from Joe Flacco (Justin Tucker kick), 0:59. Ravens 17–7. **Drive: 3 plays, 45 yards, 0:37.**
- CLE – Zane Gonzalez 45-yard field goal, 0:00. Ravens 17–10. **Drive: 7 plays, 47 yards, 0:59.**

**Third quarter**

- BAL – Brandon Williams 1-yard fumble return (Justin Tucker kick), 7:06. Ravens 24–10.
- BAL – Justin Tucker 43-yard field goal, 0:04. Ravens 27–10. **Drive: 8 plays, 36 yards, 3:13.**

**Fourth quarter**

- No scoring plays.

**Top passers**

- BAL – Joe Flacco – 26/42, 288 yards, TD
- CLE – DeShone Kizer – 20/37, 146 yards, 2 INT

**Top rushers**

- BAL – Javorius Allen – 13 rushes, 70 yards
- CLE – Isaiah Crowell – 5 rushes, 72 yards

**Top receivers**

- BAL – Mike Wallace – 6 receptions, 89 yards
- CLE – Josh Gordon – 5 receptions, 47 yards

**Top tacklers**

- BAL – Patrick Onwuasor – 3 tackles, 4 assists
- CLE – Christian Kirksey – 6 tackles, 6 assists

The Browns then stayed home for their home finale of the season. The Ravens scored the first quarter's only points when Justin Tucker kicked a 31-yard field goal to make it 3–0. In the second quarter, the Browns took the lead when Duke Johnson Jr. ran for a 12-yard touchdown to make it 7–3. The Ravens moved back into the lead when Joe Flacco ran for a 2-yard touchdown followed up by him finding Benjamin Watson on a 33-yard pass to make it 17–7. Zane Gonzalez got the Browns within a touchdown when he kicked a 45-yard field goal to make it 17–10 at halftime. In the third quarter, the Ravens scored the second half's only 10 points to eventually seal the game when Brandon Williams recovered a fumble for a 1-yard touchdown to make it 24–10. Tucker then hit a 43-yard field goal. The Ravens defeated the Browns 27–10,

With the loss, the Browns fell to 0–14. The Browns were held winless at home for the first time since 1999. The Browns also started 0–14 in consecutive seasons.

==== Week 16: at Chicago Bears ====
Week Sixteen: Cleveland Browns at Chicago Bears – Game summary

Quarter	1	2	3	4	Total
Browns	0	3	0	0	**3**
**Bears**	6	0	14	0	**20**

at Soldier Field, Chicago, Illinois

- Date: December 24
- Game time: 1:00 pm. EST/12:00 pm. CST
- Game weather: 24 °F (−4 °C), cloudy
- Game attendance: 58,796
- Referee: Terry McAulay
- TV announcers (CBS): Tom McCarthy, Steve Beuerlein and Steve Tasker
- Recap, Gamebook

Game information

**First quarter**

- CHI – Jordan Howard 2-yard run (kick failed), 1:23. Bears 6–0. **Drive: 9 plays, 57 yards, 5:11.**

**Second quarter**

- CLE – Zane Gonzalez 48-yard field goal, 0:06. Bears 6–3. **Drive: 4 plays, 48 yards, 0:30.**

**Third quarter**

- CHI – Jordan Howard 16-yard run (Mike Nugent kick), 12:30. Bears 13–3. **Drive: 4 plays, 60 yards, 2:37.**
- CHI – Mitchell Trubisky 4-yard run (Mike Nugent kick), 3:33. Bears 20–3. **Drive: 12 plays, 66 yards, 7:30.**

**Fourth quarter**

- No scoring plays.

**Top passers**

- CLE – DeShone Kizer – 18/36, 182 yards, 2 INT
- CHI – Mitchell Trubisky – 14/23, 193 yards

**Top rushers**

- CLE – Isaiah Crowell – 12 rushes, 44 yards
- CHI – Jordan Howard – 22 rushes, 44 yards, 2 TD

**Top receivers**

- CLE – Duke Johnson – 7 receptions, 81 yards
- CHI – Benny Cunningham – 2 receptions, 62 yards

**Top tacklers**

- CLE – James Burgess - 7 tackles, 2 assists
- CHI – Danny Trevathan - 5 tackles, 1 assist

The Browns then traveled to Chicago to take on the Bears. In the first quarter, the Bears scored first when Jordan Howard ran for a 2-yard touchdown (with a failed PAT) to make it 6–0. In the second quarter, the Browns scored when Zane Gonzalez kicked a 48-yard field goal to make it 6–3 at halftime. In the third quarter, it was all Bears when Howard ran for a 16-yard touchdown to make it 13–3. This was followed by Mitchell Trubisky's 4-yard run for a touchdown to make it 20–3. With the fourth quarter scoreless, this was the final score.

With their 20th consecutive away loss, the Browns fell to 0–15. They also became the first franchise in NFL history to have multiple and consecutive seasons with 15 or more losses. The loss also secured the #1 overall draft pick for a second straight season. The Browns became the first team since the 1999 and 2000 Browns to have the #1 overall pick in back-to-back drafts, and the first non-expansion team to do so since the 1994 and 1995 Cincinnati Bengals.

==== Week 17: at Pittsburgh Steelers ====
Week Seventeen: Cleveland Browns at Pittsburgh Steelers – Game summary

Quarter	1	2	3	4	Total
Browns	0	14	10	0	**24**
**Steelers**	7	14	7	0	**28**

at Heinz Field, Pittsburgh, Pennsylvania

- Date: December 31
- Game time: 1:00 pm. EST
- Game weather: 11 °F (−12 °C), snow
- Game attendance: 50,704
- Referee: Jerome Boger
- TV announcers (CBS): Spero Dedes and Adam Archuleta
- Recap, Gamebook

Game information

**First quarter**

- PIT – Darrius Heyward-Bey 29-yard run (Chris Boswell kick), 10:52. Steelers 7–0. **Drive: 8 plays, 72 yards, 4:17.**

**Second quarter**

- PIT – JuJu Smith-Schuster 20-yard pass from Landry Jones (Chris Boswell kick), 13:32. Steelers 14–0. **Drive: 3 plays, 28 yards, 2:09.**
- CLE – Duke Johnson 2-yard run (Zane Gonzalez kick), 11:49. Steelers 14–7. **Drive: 5 plays, 74 yards, 1:40.**
- PIT – Stevan Ridley 4-yard run (Chris Boswell kick), 8:03. Steelers 21–7. **Drive: 8 plays, 75 yards, 3:47.**
- CLE – Rashard Higgins 56-yard pass from DeShone Kizer (Zane Gonzalez kick), 7:22. Steelers 21–14. **Drive: 2 plays, 60 yards, 0:46.**

**Third quarter**

- CLE – Rashard Higgins 5-yard pass from DeShone Kizer (Zane Gonzalez kick), 10:59. Tied 21–21. **Drive: 7 plays, 68 yards, 4:06.**
- PIT – JuJu Smith-Schuster 96-yard kickoff return (Chris Boswell kick), 10:54. Steelers 28–21.
- CLE – Zane Gonzalez 51-yard field goal, 2:09. Steelers 28–24. **Drive: 16 plays, 55 yards, 8:38.**

**Fourth quarter**

- No scoring plays.

**Top passers**

- CLE – DeShone Kizer – 16/30, 314 yards, 2 TD, INT
- PIT – Landry Jones – 23/27, 239 yards, TD, INT

**Top rushers**

- CLE – DeShone Kizer – 6 rushes, 61 yards
- PIT – Stevan Ridley – 17 rushes, 80 yards, TD

**Top receivers**

- CLE – Josh Gordon – 4 receptions, 115 yards
- PIT – JuJu Smith-Schuster – 9 receptions, 143 yards, TD

**Top tacklers**

- CLE – Joe Schobert - 9 tackles, 3 assists
- PIT – T. J. Watt and Tyson Alualu - 6 tackles and 2 assists each

In their final hope of averting a winless season, the Browns played their regular season finale against the Pittsburgh Steelers at Heinz Field, whom they had not beaten on the road since 2003. The Browns were competitive throughout the game due to the Steelers resting most of their starters due to already clinching a spot in the playoffs. The Steelers took an early lead in the first quarter when Darrius Heyward-Bey ran for a 29-yard run for a touchdown to make it 7–0. They made it 14–0 in the second quarter when Landry Jones found JuJu Smith-Schuster for a 20-yard pass. The Browns then got on the board when Duke Johnson ran for a 2-yard touchdown to make it 14–7. The game moved back to a 14-point game after Stevan Ridley ran for a 4-yard touchdown to make it 21–7 in the Steelers favor. The Browns then came within 7 when DeShone Kizer found Rashard Higgins on a 56-yard pass to make it 21–14 at halftime. In the third quarter, the Browns managed to tie the game at 21–21 when Kizer and Higgins connected again on a 5-yard pass. The Steelers retook the lead when Smith-Schuster returned the ensuing kickoff 96 yards for a touchdown to make it 28–21. Zane Gonzalez then got the Browns within 4 with a 51-yard field goal to make it 28–24.

In a highly defensive fourth quarter, the Browns tried to rally a comeback and win. However, on 4th-and-2 with 1:46 left in the game, Browns receiver Corey Coleman dropped a wide open pass from Kizer at the Steelers' 11-yard line, giving the ball back to the Steelers on downs and sealing the Browns' fate.

With the loss, the Browns became the second team in NFL history to finish 0–16 after the 2008 Detroit Lions. Hue Jackson's career record with the Browns fell to 1–31, the worst 32-game record since the league adopted a 16-game schedule in 1978. The Browns tied their franchise record of 17 straight losses. It also was their 21st consecutive road loss, 17th consecutive loss against a divisional opponent, and 14th consecutive loss in Pittsburgh. The Browns lost 50 of 55 games between Week 10 of the 2014 season and the end of the 2017 season.

Later that afternoon, the Buffalo Bills' win over the Miami Dolphins - coupled with the Cincinnati Bengals win over the Baltimore Ravens - gave the Bills a playoff berth, ending their 17-year playoff drought. As a result, the Browns held the longest active postseason drought of any NFL team going back to 2002.

== 2018 Pro Bowl ==
Despite the team's historically awful performance, linebacker Joe Schobert was named to the AFC team for the 2018 Pro Bowl. This marked Schobert's first Pro Bowl selection.

Tackle Joe Thomas, who was injured during the season, was not selected for the Pro Bowl for the first and only time of his career.

== Aftermath and fan reaction ==
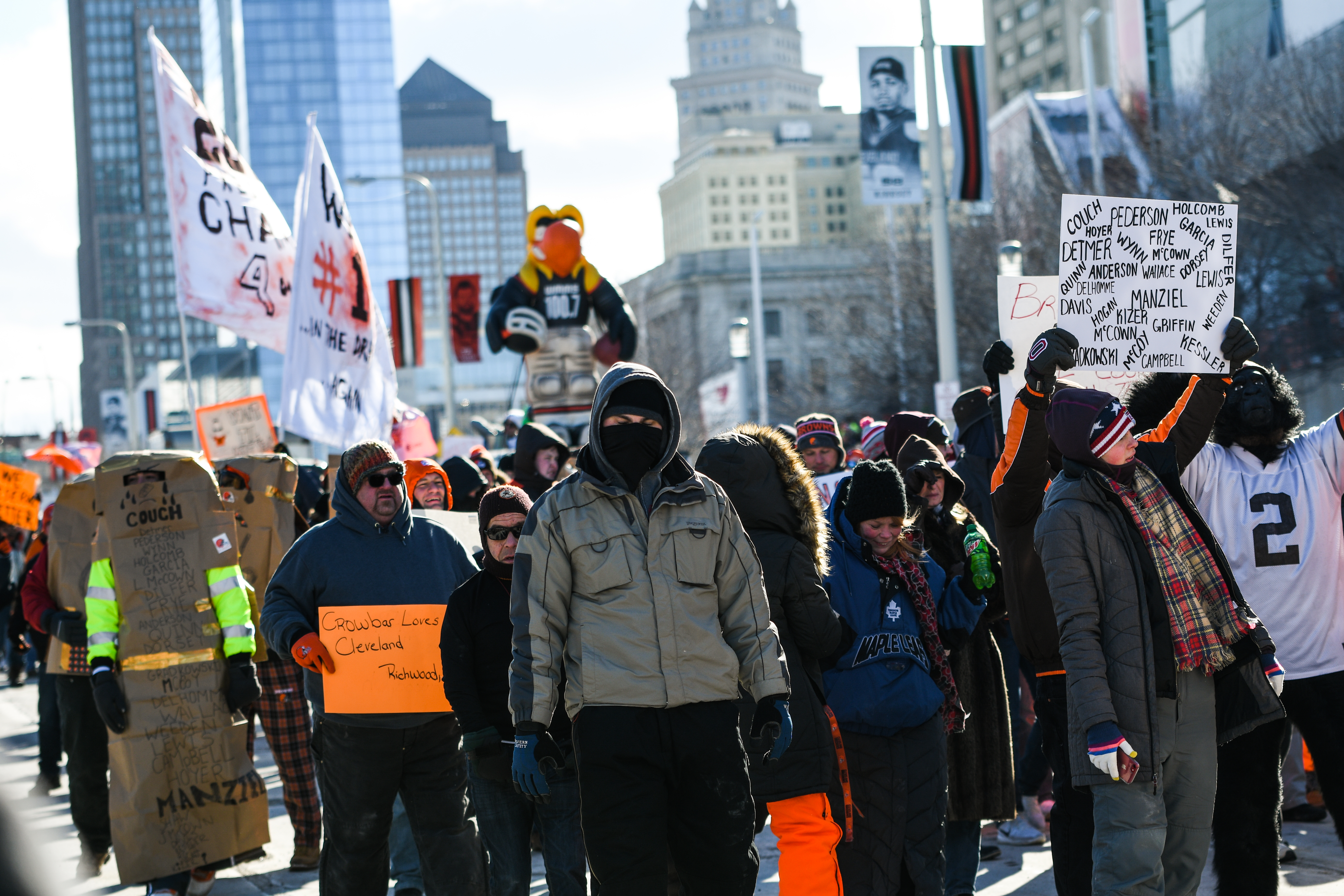
Fans at the imperfect season parade

A parade was held on January 6, 2018, at FirstEnergy Stadium in "honor" of the Browns' imperfect season and general ineptitude. It was organized by fan Chris McNeil through the contributions of fellow Browns fans and pain reliever manufacturer Excedrin. The parade's route went in the shape of a circle, signifying the number zero. Additionally, the parade organization raised over $17,000 of charitable donations which went to the Cleveland Food Bank.

Having secured the #1 overall pick in the 2018 NFL Draft, the Browns selected quarterback Baker Mayfield. In his first game, Mayfield would help end the Browns' winless streak dating back to Christmas Eve 2016 with a 21–17 win against the New York Jets in Week 3.

== Standings ==
=== Division ===
AFC North
	W	L	T	PCT	DIV	CONF	PF	PA	STK
^{(2)} Pittsburgh Steelers	13	3	0	.813	6–0	10–2	406	308	W2
Baltimore Ravens	9	7	0	.563	3–3	7–5	395	303	L1
Cincinnati Bengals	7	9	0	.438	3–3	6–6	290	349	W2
Cleveland Browns	0	16	0	.000	0–6	0–12	234	410	L16

=== Conference ===
AFC
#	Team	Division	W	L	T	PCT	DIV	CONF	SOS	SOV	STK
Division leaders
1 (Note: New England claimed the No. 1 seed over Pittsburgh based on head-to-head victory.)	New England Patriots	East	13	3	0	.813	5–1	10–2	.484	.466	W3
2	Pittsburgh Steelers	North	13	3	0	.813	6–0	10–2	.453	.423	W2
3 (Note: Jacksonville claimed the No. 3 seed over Kansas City based on conference record.)	Jacksonville Jaguars	South	10	6	0	.625	4–2	9–3	.434	.394	L2
4	Kansas City Chiefs	West	10	6	0	.625	5–1	8–4	.477	.481	W4
Wild Cards
5 (Note: Tennessee finished ahead of Buffalo, Baltimore and Los Angeles Chargers based on conference record, claiming the No. 5 seed. Buffalo and Baltimore finished ahead of Los Angeles Chargers based on conference record. Buffalo claimed the No. 6 seed over Baltimore based on strength of victory.)	Tennessee Titans	South	9	7	0	.563	5–1	8–4	.434	.396	W1
6	Buffalo Bills	East	9	7	0	.563	3–3	7–5	.492	.396	W1
Did not qualify for the postseason
7	Baltimore Ravens	North	9	7	0	.563	3–3	7–5	.441	.299	L1
8	Los Angeles Chargers	West	9	7	0	.563	3–3	6–6	.457	.347	W2
9	Cincinnati Bengals	North	7	9	0	.438	3–3	6–6	.465	.321	W2
10 (Note: Oakland finished ahead of Miami based on head-to-head victory.)	Oakland Raiders	West	6	10	0	.375	2–4	5–7	.512	.396	L4
11	Miami Dolphins	East	6	10	0	.375	2–4	5–7	.543	.531	L3
12 (Note: Denver finished ahead of the New York Jets based on head-to-head victory.)	Denver Broncos	West	5	11	0	.313	2–4	4–8	.492	.413	L2
13	New York Jets	East	5	11	0	.313	2–4	5–7	.520	.438	L4
14 (Note: Indianapolis finished ahead of Houston based on head-to-head sweep.)	Indianapolis Colts	South	4	12	0	.250	2–4	3–9	.480	.219	W1
15	Houston Texans	South	4	12	0	.250	1–5	3–9	.516	.375	L6
16	Cleveland Browns	North	0	16	0	.000	0–6	0–12	.520	–	L16
Tiebreakers (Note: When breaking ties for three or more teams under the NFL's rules, they are first broken within divisions, then comparing only the highest ranked remaining team from each division.)
