= James Burgess (American football, born 1994) =

American football player (born 1994)

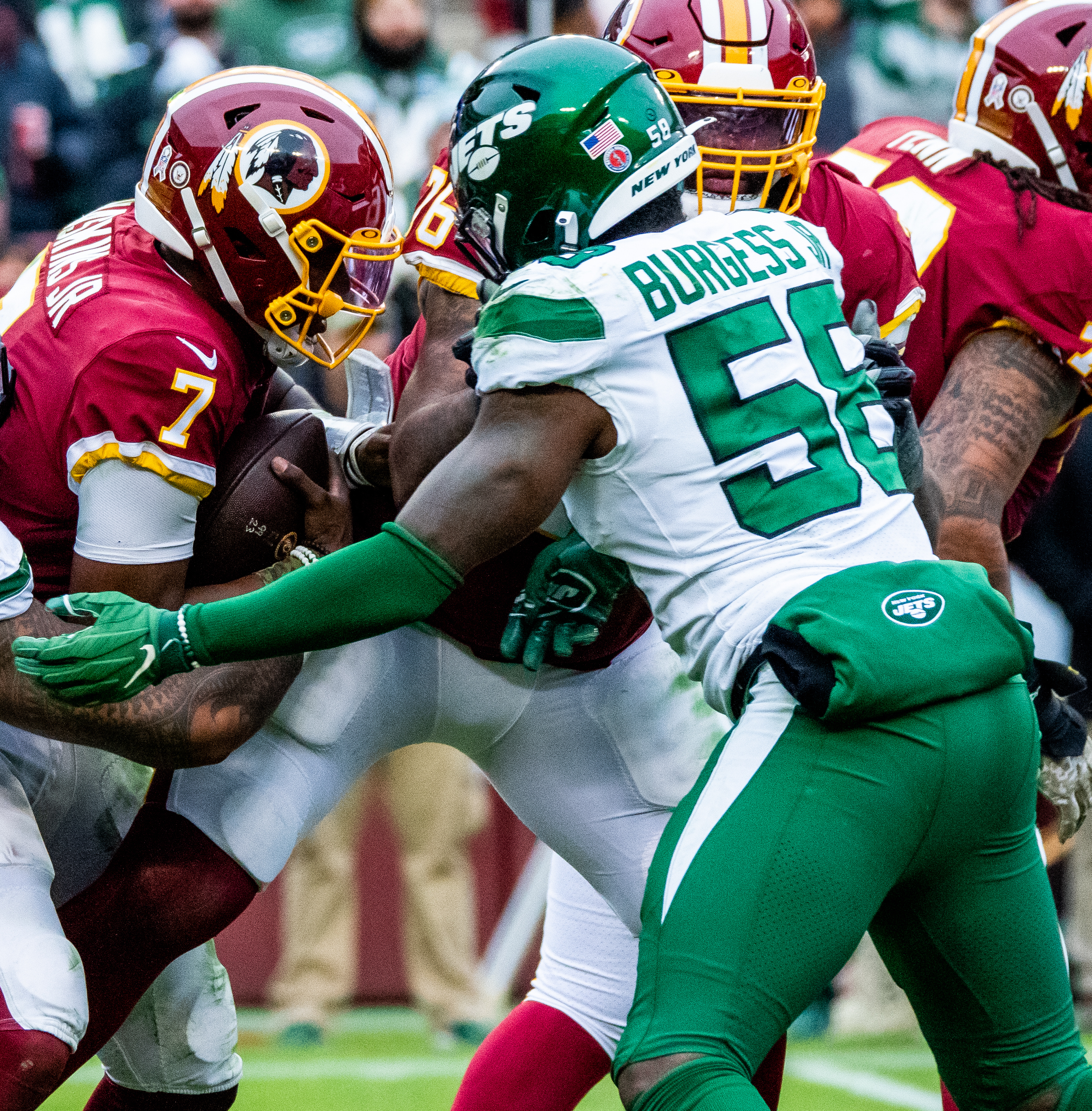
- Burgess with the New York Jets in 2019

No. 52, 58, 57
- Position: Linebacker

Personal information
- Born: March 9, 1994 (age 32); Florida City, Florida, U.S.
- Listed height: 6 ft 0 in (1.83 m)
- Listed weight: 230 lb (104 kg)

Career information
- High school: Homestead (Homestead, Florida)
- College: Louisville
- NFL draft: 2016: undrafted

Career history
- Miami Dolphins (2016)*; San Diego Chargers (2016)*; Baltimore Ravens (2016)*; Jacksonville Jaguars (2016)*; Cleveland Browns (2016–2018); Miami Dolphins (2018–2019)*; New York Jets (2019); Atlanta Falcons (2020)*; Green Bay Packers (2020); San Francisco 49ers (2021)*
- * Offseason or practice squad member only

Career NFL statistics
- Total tackles: 166
- Sacks: 4.5
- Forced fumbles: 2
- Fumble recoveries: 1
- Interceptions: 1
- Stats at Pro Football Reference

James Paul Burgess Jr. (born March 9, 1994) is an American former professional football player who was a linebacker in the National Football League (NFL). He played college football for the Louisville Cardinals.

His father, James Burgess, also played in the NFL.

== Professional career ==
Pre-draft measurables
Height	Weight	Arm length	Hand span	40-yard dash	10-yard split	20-yard split	20-yard shuttle	Three-cone drill	Vertical jump	Broad jump	Bench press
6 ft 0 1/4 in (1.84 m)	229 lb (104 kg)	30 3/8 in (0.77 m)	10 3/8 in (0.26 m)	4.72 s	1.68 s	2.66 s	4.43 s	6.99 s	32.5 in (0.83 m)	10 ft 1 in (3.07 m)	21 reps
All values from Pro Day

=== Miami Dolphins (first stint) ===
Burgess signed with the Miami Dolphins as an undrafted free agent on May 6, 2016. On September 3, 2016, he was released by the Dolphins as part of final roster cuts and was signed to the practice squad the next day. He was released on September 13, 2016.

=== San Diego Chargers ===
On November 1, 2016, Burgess was signed to the San Diego Chargers' practice squad. He was released on November 14, 2016.

=== Baltimore Ravens ===
On November 23, 2016, Burgess was signed to the Baltimore Ravens' practice squad. He was released on November 29, 2016.

=== Jacksonville Jaguars ===
On December 7, 2016, Burgess was signed to the Jacksonville Jaguars' practice squad. He was released on December 16, 2016.

=== Cleveland Browns ===
On December 20, 2016, Burgess was signed to the Cleveland Browns' practice squad. He signed a reserve/future contract with the Browns on January 2, 2017.

In 2018, Burgess suffered a sprained knee and missed the next two games before returning in Week 6. He suffered a hamstring injury in that game and was waived/injured on October 16, 2018. After clearing waivers, Burgess was placed on injured reserve on October 17, 2018, and was released three days later.

=== Miami Dolphins (second stint) ===
On December 4, 2018, Burgess was signed to the Dolphins practice squad. He signed a reserve/future contract with the Dolphins on January 1, 2019. He was waived on May 23, 2019.

=== New York Jets ===
On May 28, 2019, the New York Jets claimed Burgess off of waivers. He was waived on August 31, 2019, and was later re-signed to the practice squad. He was promoted to the active roster on October 26, 2019.

On April 2, 2020, Burgess re-signed with the Jets. He was placed on the reserve/COVID-19 list by the team on August 5, 2020. He was activated from the list on August 13. On September 5, 2020, Burgess was waived by the Jets.

=== Atlanta Falcons ===
On October 13, 2020, Burgess was signed to the Atlanta Falcons practice squad.

=== Green Bay Packers ===
On October 24, 2020, Burgess was signed off the Falcons' practice squad to the Green Bay Packers' active roster. He was placed on injured reserve on November 25, 2020. He was designated to return from injured reserve on January 20, 2021, and began practicing with the team again, but was not activated before the end of the postseason.

=== San Francisco 49ers ===
On June 2, 2021, Burgess signed with the San Francisco 49ers. Burgess was waived on August 16, 2021.

== NFL career statistics ==
=== Regular season ===
Year	Team	GP	GS	Tackles					Interceptions						Fumbles	
Year	Team	GP	GS	Total	Solo	Ast	Sck	SFTY	PDef	Int	Yds	Avg	Lng	TDs	FF	FR
2017	CLE	14	9	75	49	26	4.0	0	3	0	0	0	0	0	1	0
2018	CLE	3	2	8	6	2	0.0	0	0	0	0	0.0	0	0	0	0
2019	NYJ	10	10	78	49	29	0.5	1	5	1	2	2.0	2	0	1	1
2020	GB	4	0	2	2	0	0.0	0	0	0	0	0.0	0	0	0	0
Total		31	21	163	106	57	4.5	1	8	1	2	2.0	2	0	2	1
Source: NFL.com
