= Hue Jackson =

American football coach (born 1965)

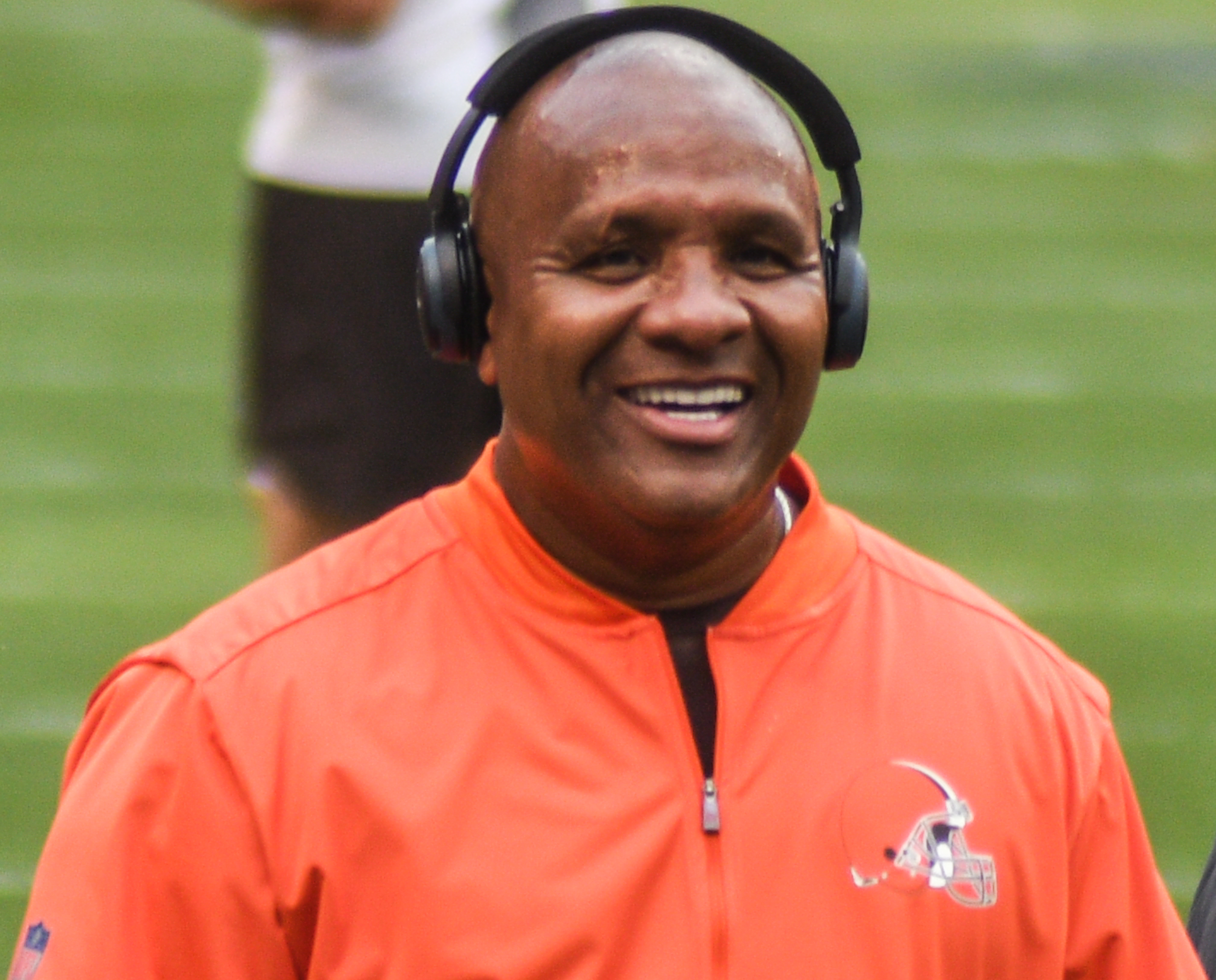
- Jackson with the Cleveland Browns in 2017

Georgia State Panthers
- Title: Offensive coordinator & quarterbacks coach

Personal information
- Born: October 22, 1965 (age 61); Los Angeles, California, U.S.

Career information
- High school: Susan Miller Dorsey (Los Angeles)
- College: Pacific

Career history
- Pacific (1987–1989) Graduate assistant, wide receivers coach, running backs coach, & special teams coach; Cal State Fullerton (1990–1991) Running backs coach & special teams coach; London Monarchs (1991) Running backs coach; Arizona State (1992–1994) Running backs coach; Arizona State (1995) Quarterbacks coach; California (1996) Offensive coordinator & quarterbacks coach; USC (1997) Offensive coordinator & quarterbacks coach; USC (1998–1999) Offensive coordinator & running backs coach; USC (2000) Offensive coordinator & quarterbacks coach; Washington Redskins (2001–2002) Running backs coach; Washington Redskins (2003) Offensive coordinator; Cincinnati Bengals (2004–2006) Wide receivers coach; Atlanta Falcons (2007) Offensive coordinator; Baltimore Ravens (2008–2009) Quarterbacks coach; Oakland Raiders (2010) Offensive coordinator; Oakland Raiders (2011) Head coach; Cincinnati Bengals (2012) Secondary assistant & special teams assistant coach; Cincinnati Bengals (2013) Running backs coach; Cincinnati Bengals (2014–2015) Offensive coordinator; Cleveland Browns (2016–2018) Head coach; Cincinnati Bengals (2018) Special assistant head coach; Tennessee State (2021) Offensive coordinator & quarterbacks coach; Grambling State (2022–2023) Head coach; Georgia State (2024) Assistant general manager; Georgia State (2025–present) Offensive coordinator & quarterbacks coach

Awards and highlights
- World Bowl champion ('91); PFWA NFL Assistant Coach of the Year (2015)

Head coaching record
- Regular season: NFL: 11–44–1 (.205)
- Career: NFL: 11–44–1 (.205); NCAA: 8–14 (.364)
- Coaching profile at Pro Football Reference

Hue Jackson (born October 22, 1965) is an American football coach who is the offensive coordinator and quarterbacks coach at Georgia State University, a position he has held since 2024. An offensive assistant at both the collegiate and professional levels, he held coordinator positions in the National Football League (NFL) with the Washington Redskins in 2003, the Atlanta Falcons in 2007, the Oakland Raiders in 2010, and the Cincinnati Bengals from 2014 to 2015. He also served as the head coach of the Raiders in 2011 and Cleveland Browns from 2016 to 2018. Jackson compiled a 3–36–1 record with the Browns, including a winless season in 2017, which is the worst record among coaches who presided over an NFL team for at least 40 games. He later returned to coaching at the HBCU level, where he spent a season at Tennessee State University, and was the head coach at Grambling State University from 2022 to 2023.

== Early life and playing career ==
Jackson, a native of Los Angeles, was a quarterback at Dorsey High School in his hometown, where he also lettered in basketball. He starred in football at Glendale (CA) Community College in 1983 and 1984, where he earned his associate degree in 1984.

Jackson played quarterback at Pacific in the mid-1980s under Bob Cope. As a junior, Jackson had 1,595 yards of total offense, including 502 yards rushing, second-most on the team. In his senior season, he passed for 1,455 yards and rushed for 417 yards. As a quarterback at University of the Pacific from 1985 to 1986, Jackson threw for 2,544 yards and 19 touchdowns and the Tigers went 9–14 in Jackson's two seasons. He also lettered in basketball in 1986 and earned his degree in physical education.

== Coaching career ==
=== College ===
Jackson began his coaching career in 1987 at Pacific, his alma mater. Jackson spent three years there from 1987 to 1989. From 1990 to 1991, Jackson was the running backs coach and special teams coordinator at Cal State Fullerton. In the spring of 1991, he coached the running backs, receivers and special teams for the World League’s inaugural year champion London Monarchs. Later on, he spent four years (1992–1995) at Arizona State, where he was running backs coach for the first three years (1992–1994), then he handled the Sun Devil quarterbacks in 1995. He led California’s high-powered offense in 1996 as its offensive coordinator and quarterbacks coach, he helped lead the Golden Bears to an Aloha Bowl berth. Jackson served as University of Southern California's offensive coordinator from 1997 to 2000, helping to recruit and develop players, including quarterback Carson Palmer, with whom he was later reunited in Cincinnati and Oakland.

Jackson also held three NFL summer coaching internships, in 1990 with the Los Angeles Rams, 1992 with the Phoenix Cardinals and 1995 with the Washington Redskins.

=== Washington Redskins ===
From 2001 until 2002, Jackson was the Redskins' running backs coach under Marty Schottenheimer and Steve Spurrier. In 2001, under Jackson's tutelage, running back Stephen Davis rushed for 1,432 yards, breaking the record he had set in 1999 for most rushing yards in a season by a Redskin. In 2002, Davis was on pace for another 1,000-yard rushing season before suffering a season-ending injury. Jackson was promoted to offensive coordinator in Washington by Spurrier in 2003 and handled the team's offensive play-calling, becoming the only coach to perform that duty other than the head coach.

=== Cincinnati Bengals (first stint) ===
Jackson was the wide receivers coach for the Cincinnati Bengals for three seasons. Under Jackson's tutelage in Cincinnati, Chad Johnson and T. J. Houshmandzadeh became one of the most prolific wide-receiving tandems in the NFL. In 2005, the Johnson-Houshmandzadeh tandem combined to total 175 receptions for 2,388 yards, while helping the team secure the AFC North title and a playoff berth for the first time in 15 years. In 2006, Johnson (1,369 yards) and Houshmandzadeh (1,081 yards) became the first pair of Bengals to eclipse the 1,000-yard receiving mark in a single season. In each of Jackson's three years in Cincinnati, Johnson was named to the Pro Bowl.

=== Atlanta Falcons ===
In 2007, after leaving Cincinnati, Jackson was an NFL offensive coordinator for the second time when he served in that capacity for the Atlanta Falcons under Bobby Petrino and interim head coach Emmitt Thomas.

=== Baltimore Ravens ===
From 2008 until 2009, Jackson was Baltimore's quarterbacks coach under head coach John Harbaugh. In 2008, Jackson tutored Joe Flacco, who became the first rookie quarterback to win two playoff games in NFL history as the Ravens advanced to the AFC Championship game. He helped the Ravens advance to the postseason in both seasons.

=== Oakland Raiders ===
In 2010, under Jackson's guidance as offensive coordinator, the Raiders' offense finished fourth in the AFC and sixth in the NFL in scoring (25.6 points per game). They also finished fifth in the AFC and 10th in the NFL in total offense (354.6 yards per game), and second in the NFL and AFC in rushing (155.9 yards per game). The Raiders more than doubled their scoring output from the previous year, totaling 410 points. Under Jackson's offense, running back Darren McFadden finished the season with 1,157 yards rushing on 223 carries for a 5.2 average yards/carry and 7 rushing touchdowns. McFadden also had 47 receptions for 507 yards and 3 touchdowns. His end of year numbers were 1,664 total yards and 10 total touchdowns for the 2010 NFL season, making McFadden the NFL's 5th leader in total yards from scrimmage for the 2010 season.

After the 2010 season, Jackson was named head coach of the Oakland Raiders in 2011, succeeding Tom Cable. Jackson was fired by the Raiders on January 10, 2012, after one season as head coach, by new general manager Reggie McKenzie. In his lone season as head coach, the Raiders finished with a record of 8–8 and missed the playoffs after starting the season 7–4.

=== Cincinnati Bengals (second stint) ===
On February 17, 2012, Jackson returned to the Cincinnati Bengals working as an assistant defensive backs coach as well as assisting on special teams. The Bengals finished 10–6 in 2012 and made the playoffs, losing in the wild card round to the Houston Texans on the road. On January 14, 2013, Jackson interviewed for the offensive coordinator position with the Carolina Panthers. On January 30, 2013, Jackson became the Bengals running backs coach, replacing the retired Jim Anderson. He was promoted to offensive coordinator in January 2014, replacing Jay Gruden. Jackson spent seven years with the Bengals.

=== Cleveland Browns ===
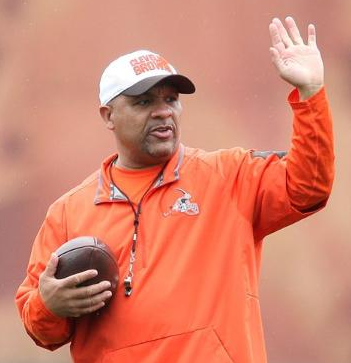
Jackson in 2016

On January 13, 2016, Jackson was hired as head coach of the Cleveland Browns. On December 18, 2016, Jackson became the first NFL coach since Rod Marinelli in 2008 to start a season 0–14. Jackson got his first win with the Browns in a 20–17 victory over the San Diego Chargers on December 24, 2016. The Browns finished the season with a 1–15 record, finishing last in the NFL. The Browns finished the 2017 season without a single win, making the Browns the second team in league history to finish with a 0–16 record, after the Detroit Lions in 2008.

On October 29, 2018, the Browns announced that they had fired Jackson, who had amassed a record of 3–36–1 during his tenure with the team, including a 2–5–1 start to the 2018 season. He also never won a road game during his tenure with Cleveland (0–20).

=== Cincinnati Bengals (third stint) ===
On November 12, 2018, Jackson joined the Cincinnati Bengals coaching staff in an unspecified role. The following day, it was confirmed that he would serve as an assistant to head coach Marvin Lewis. On January 11, 2019, Jackson was released by the Bengals.

=== Post-Cleveland Browns ===
On November 14, 2019, it was reported that Jackson would lead the drills during the NFL sanctioned workout for free agent quarterback Colin Kaepernick on November 16, 2019. However, on November 16, the location of the workout was changed and Jackson was unable to oversee the event.

On March 29, 2021, in an interview with 850 ESPN Cleveland, Jackson stated he was writing a book about his time with the Cleveland Browns, which would be released later in the year. He said that he was "lied to" by Browns owner Jimmy Haslam regarding the state of the franchise and the team's impending rebuild that took place following his firing. He also said he received a one-year contract extension halfway through the Browns' 0-16 campaign in 2017 that the team decided not to make public. In early 2022, after former Miami Dolphins coach Brian Flores said that Miami's owner paid him to lose games, Jackson made similar allegations against Haslam.

=== Tennessee State Tigers ===
On April 15, 2021, Jackson joined Tennessee State's coaching staff as the new offensive coordinator for the 2021 season, under new coach Eddie George. The Tigers finished with a 5–6 record and an average of 19.7 points per game for the 2021 season.

=== Grambling State Tigers ===
On December 10, 2021, Jackson was hired to be the 14th head coach of the Grambling State Tigers. It marks his first time serving as a head coach in college football. He was fired in November 2023 after two seasons with a combined 8–14 record.

=== Georgia State Panthers ===
In June 2024, Jackson was hired as the assistant general manager of the Georgia State Panthers football team, working under head coach Dell McGee. In 2025, he was promoted to offensive coordinator following the departure of Jim Chaney, who stepped down after one season in the role.

== Head coaching record ==
Team	Year	Regular season					Postseason			
Team	Year	Won	Lost	Ties	Win %	Finish	Won	Lost	Win %	Result
OAK	2011	8	8	0	.500	3rd in AFC West	–	–	–	–
OAK total		8	8	0	.500		–	–	–	–
CLE	2016	1	15	0	.063	4th in AFC North	–	–	–	–
CLE	2017	0	16	0	.000	4th in AFC North	–	–	–	–
CLE	2018	2	5	1	.313	Fired	–	–	–	–
CLE total		3	36	1	.088		–	–	–	–
Total		11	44	1	.205		–	–	–	–

Year	Team	Overall	Conference	Standing	Bowl/playoffs
Grambling State Tigers (Southwestern Athletic Conference) (2022–2023)
2022	Grambling State	3–8	2–6	5th (West)	
2023	Grambling State	5–6	4–4	4th (West)	
Grambling State:		8–14	6–10		
Total:		8–14			
