= 2020 San Francisco 49ers season =

American football team season

- Owner: Jed York
- General manager: John Lynch
- Head coach: Kyle Shanahan
- Offensive coordinator: Kyle Shanahan (de facto)
- Defensive coordinator: Robert Saleh
- Home stadium: Levi's Stadium; State Farm Stadium (Note: On November 30, Santa Clara County imposed a ban on all contact sports for three weeks, later extended through January 8, due to rising COVID-19 cases. As a result, the 49ers were forced to play home games and practice from out-of-county. The team used Arizona's State Farm Stadium as a temporary venue for the remainder of the season.)

Results
- Record: 6–10
- Division place: 4th NFC West
- Playoffs: Did not qualify
- All-Pros: LB Fred Warner (1st team)
- Pro Bowlers: FB Kyle Juszczyk; T Trent Williams; LB Fred Warner

Uniform
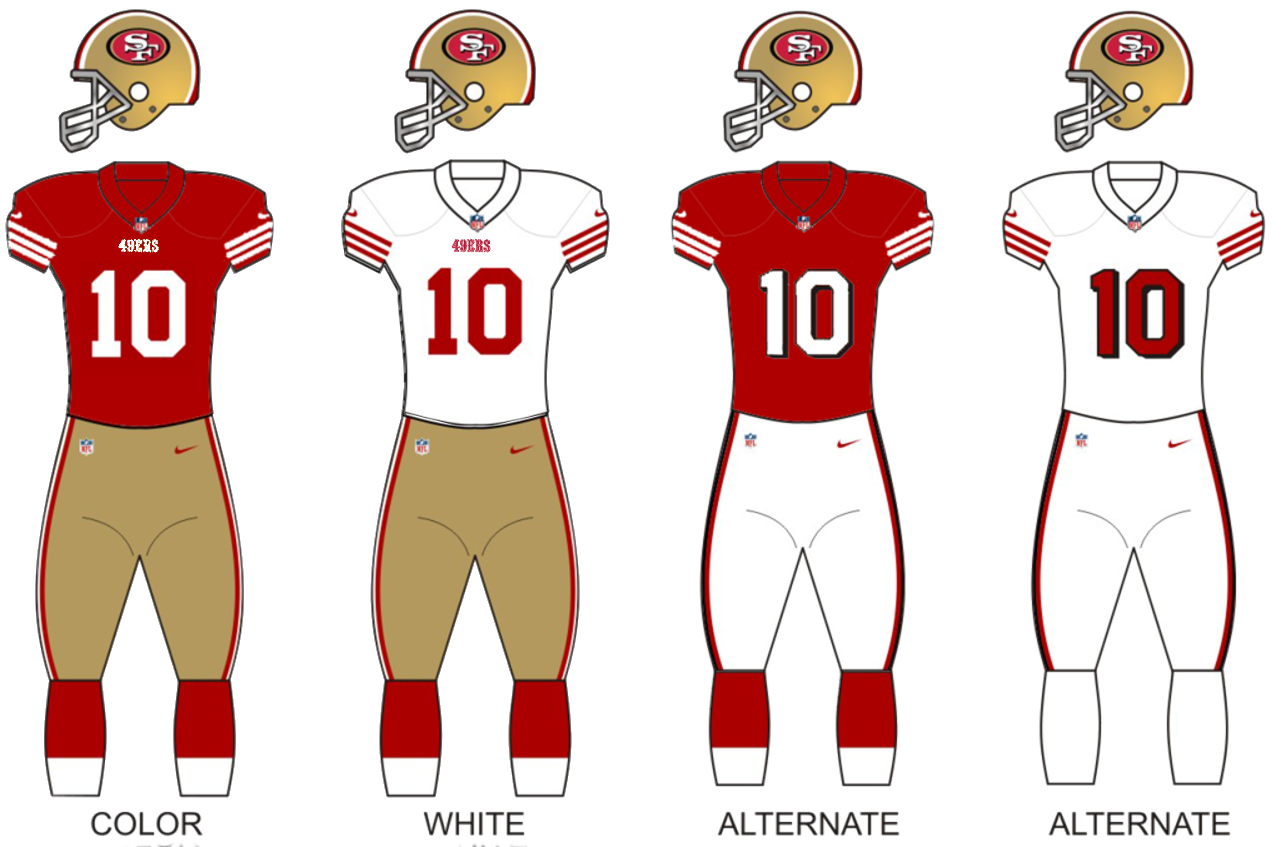

The 2020 season was the San Francisco 49ers' 71st in the National Football League (NFL), their 75th overall, and their fourth under the head coach/general manager tandem of Kyle Shanahan and John Lynch. The 49ers entered the season as the defending NFC champions; however, the 49ers failed to improve on their 13–3 season after a Week 8 loss to the Seattle Seahawks and were eliminated from playoff contention after a Week 15 loss to the Dallas Cowboys.

The season saw many key players missing significant time due to injuries, including starting quarterback Jimmy Garoppolo, starting tight-end George Kittle, starting cornerback Richard Sherman, starting wide receiver Deebo Samuel, and 2019 Defensive Rookie of the Year Nick Bosa. The 49ers season ended with a league-high 18 players on injured reserve. Another notable event was the suspension of home games in Santa Clara County due to the ongoing COVID-19 pandemic, forcing the 49ers to play their final three home games at State Farm Stadium in Glendale, Arizona.

== Offseason ==
=== Roster changes ===
==== Free agency ====
The 49ers entered free agency with the following:

Position	Player	Free agency tag	Date signed	2020 Team	Notes
WR	Emmanuel Sanders	UFA	March 22, 2020	New Orleans Saints	Signed two-year contract
FS	Jimmie Ward	UFA	March 24, 2020	San Francisco 49ers	Signed three-year contract
CB	Jason Verrett	UFA	April 13, 2020	San Francisco 49ers	Signed one-year contract
DE	Arik Armstead	UFA	March 16, 2020	San Francisco 49ers	Signed five-year contract
OT	Shon Coleman	UFA	March 16, 2020	San Francisco 49ers	Signed one-year contract
C	Ben Garland	UFA	March 28, 2020	San Francisco 49ers	Signed one-year contract
TE	Levine Toilolo	UFA	March 18, 2020	New York Giants	
DE	Damontre Moore	UFA			
WR	Jordan Matthews	UFA			
CB	Dontae Johnson	UFA	April 13, 2020	San Francisco 49ers	Signed one-year contract
DT	Sheldon Day	UFA	March 25, 2020	Indianapolis Colts	
DE	Anthony Zettel	UFA	March 25, 2020	Minnesota Vikings	
DE	Ronald Blair	UFA	March 23, 2020	San Francisco 49ers	Signed one-year contract
LB	Elijah Lee	RFA	March 27, 2020	Detroit Lions	
RB	Matt Breida	RFA	April 16, 2020	San Francisco 49ers	Signed one-year contract
WR	Kendrick Bourne	RFA	March 17, 2020	San Francisco 49ers	Tendered one-year contract
OT	Andrew Lauderdale	ERFA			
OT	Daniel Brunskill	ERFA	March 5, 2020	San Francisco 49ers	Tendered one-year contract
TE	Ross Dwelley	ERFA	March 24, 2020	San Francisco 49ers	Signed one-year contract
CB	Emmanuel Moseley	ERFA	July 28, 2020	San Francisco 49ers	Signed one-year contract
QB	Nick Mullens	ERFA	May 1, 2020	San Francisco 49ers	Signed one-year contract
RB	Jeff Wilson	ERFA	March 5, 2020	San Francisco 49ers	Tendered one-year contract
RFA: Restricted free agent, UFA: Unrestricted free agent, ERFA: Exclusive rights free agent LEGEND – Light green background indicates a player has been re-signed by the 49ers. – Light red background indicates a player has departed the 49ers.

==== Signings ====
Position	Player	2019 Team	Date signed	Notes
LB	Joe Walker	Arizona Cardinals	March 24, 2020	Signed one-year contract
DE	Kerry Hyder	Dallas Cowboys	March 25, 2020	Signed one-year contract
WR	Travis Benjamin	Los Angeles Chargers	April 3, 2020	Signed one-year contract
OT	Tom Compton	New York Jets	April 3, 2020	Signed one-year contract
CB	Jamar Taylor	Atlanta Falcons	July 6, 2020	Signed one-year contract
DE	Alex Barrett		August 2, 2020	
DE	Dion Jordan	Oakland Raiders	August 7, 2020	Signed one-year contract
TE	Jordan Reed	Washington Redskins	August 9, 2020	Signed one-year contract
OT	William Sweet		August 12, 2020	Signed one-year contract
C	Spencer Long	Buffalo Bills	August 13, 2020	Signed one-year contract
WR	Tavon Austin	Dallas Cowboys	August 15, 2020	Signed one-year contract
WR	J. J. Nelson	Oakland Raiders	August 15, 2020	Signed one-year contract
WR	Jaron Brown	Seattle Seahawks	August 20, 2020	Signed one-year contract
SS	Johnathan Cyprien	Atlanta Falcons	August 20, 2020	Signed one-year contract
C	Hroniss Grasu	Baltimore Ravens	August 20, 2020	Signed one-year contract
TE	Erik Swoope		August 25, 2020	Signed one-year contract
WR	River Cracraft	Philadelphia Eagles	August 27, 2020	Signed one-year contract
WR	Kevin White		August 27, 2020	Signed one-year contract
TE	MarQueis Gray		August 29, 2020	Signed one-year contract
OG	Hroniss Grasu	Baltimore Ravens	August 29, 2020	Signed one-year contract
DE	Alex Barrett		August 30, 2020	Signed one-year contract
DE	Cameron Malveaux	Washington Redskins	September 2, 2020	Signed one-year contract
WR	Mohamed Sanu	New England Patriots	September 18, 2020	Signed one-year contract
DE	Ezekiel Ansah	Seattle Seahawks	September 23, 2020	Signed one-year contract
TE	Daniel Helm		September 30, 2020	Signed one-year contract
LS	Taybor Pepper		September 30, 2020	Signed one-year contract
CB	Parnell Motley		October 13, 2020	claimed off waivers
DE	Takkarist McKinley		November 18, 2020	claimed off waivers

Indicates that the player was a free agent at the end of his respective team's 2019 season.

==== Departures ====
Position	Player	Date	Notes
TE	Garrett Celek	February 7, 2020	Retired
DT	DeForest Buckner	March 18, 2020	Traded
G	Mike Person	April 1, 2020	Released
OT	Joe Staley	April 25, 2020	Retired
LB	Joey Alfieri	July 28, 2020	Waived
CB	Jermaine Kelly	July 28, 2020	Waived
S	Derrick Kindred	July 28, 2020	Waived
G	Ray Smith	July 28, 2020	Waived
DT	Willie Henry	July 28, 2020	Waived
DE	Alex Barrett	July 30, 2020	Waived
OT	Leonard Wester	July 30, 2020	Released
FS	D. J. Reed	August 4, 2020	Waived
S	Chris Edwards	August 4, 2020	Waived
DE	Alex Barrett	August 13, 2020	Waived
TE	Daniel Helm	August 15, 2020	Waived
WR	Chris Thompson	August 15, 2020	Waived
C	Spencer Long	August 16, 2020	Retired
WR	Jaron Brown	August 27, 2020	Released
DE	Jonathan Kongbo	August 27, 2020	Waived
TE	Erik Swoope	August 29, 2020	Waived
OT	Kofi Amichia	August 29, 2020	Waived
DE	Alex Barrett	September 5, 2020	Released
WR	River Cracraft	September 5, 2020	Released
SS	Johnathan Cyprien	September 5, 2020	Released
OG	Hroniss Grasu	September 5, 2020	Released
TE	MarQueis Gray	September 5, 2020	Released
WR	Jauan Jennings	September 5, 2020	Released
CB	Dontae Johnson	September 5, 2020	Released
DE	Dion Jordan	September 5, 2020	Released
DE	Cameron Malveaux	September 5, 2020	Released
WR	Shawn Poindexter	September 5, 2020	Released
OG	Dakoda Shepley	September 5, 2020	Released
OT	William Sweet	September 5, 2020	Released
CB	Jamar Taylor	September 5, 2020	Released
LB	Joe Walker	September 5, 2020	Released
WR	Kevin White	September 5, 2020	Released
CB	Tim Harris	September 5, 2020	Released
OT	Jaryd Jones-Smith	September 5, 2020	Released
OG	Ross Reynolds	September 5, 2020	Waived
LS	Kyle Nelson	September 30, 2020	Waived
WR	Mohamed Sanu	October 6, 2020	Released
TE	Daniel Helm	October 20, 2020	Waived
DE	Alex Barrett	October 26, 2020	Waived
CB	Parnell Motley	October 26, 2020	Waived
WR	Dante Pettis	November 3, 2020	Waived
DE	Jullian Taylor	November 3, 2020	Waived
LB	Kiko Alonso	November 23, 2020	Waived

==== Trades ====
- On October 27, the 49ers traded their 2022 sixth-round selection to the New York Jets for defensive end Jordan Willis and 2021 seventh-round selection.
- On November 2, the 49ers traded Kwon Alexander to the New Orleans Saints in exchange for a fifth-round conditional pick in the 2021 NFL draft and LB Kiko Alonso.

== Draft ==
2020 San Francisco 49ers Draft
Round	Selection	Player	Position	College	Note
1	14	Javon Kinlaw	DT	South Carolina	From Tampa Bay
1	25	Brandon Aiyuk	WR	Arizona State	From Minnesota
5	153	Colton McKivitz	OT	West Virginia	From Miami
6	190	Charlie Woerner	TE	Georgia	From Philadelphia
7	217	Jauan Jennings	WR	Tennessee	From Detroit

Notes

- The 49ers traded LB Eli Harold to the Detroit Lions in exchange for a conditional seventh-round selection.
- The 49ers traded their second-round selection to the Kansas City Chiefs in exchange for DE Dee Ford.
- The 49ers traded their third- and fourth-round selections to the Denver Broncos in exchange for WR Emmanuel Sanders and Denver's fifth-round selection.
- The 49ers traded DT DeForest Buckner to the Indianapolis Colts in exchange for a first-round selection (No. 13th overall).
- The 49ers traded their first- and a seventh-round selection (13th and 245th overall) to Tampa Bay Buccaneers in exchange for a first- and a fourth-round pick (14th and 117th overall).
- The 49ers traded their first-, fourth- and fifth-round selections (31st, 117th and 176th overall) to Minnesota Vikings in exchange for a first-round pick (No. 25th overall).
- The 49ers traded their RB Matt Breida to Miami Dolphins in exchange for a fifth-round pick (No. 153rd overall).
- The 49ers traded their fifth-round selection (No. 156th overall) and a 2021 third-round selection to Washington Redskins in exchange for OT Trent Williams.
- The 49ers traded their WR Marquise Goodwin and a sixth-round selection (No. 210th overall) to Philadelphia Eagles in exchange for a sixth-round selection (No. 190th overall).

=== Undrafted free agents ===
2020 San Francisco 49ers Undrafted Free Agents
Position	Player	College	Notes
CB	DeMarkus Acy	Missouri	Waived on August 20
DT	Darrion Daniels	Nebraska	Released on September 5
WR	Chris Finke	Notre Dame	Waived on July 28
LB	Jonas Griffith	Indiana State	Waived on August 20
TE	Chase Harrell	Arkansas	Released on September 5
RB	JaMycal Hasty	Baylor	Released on September 5
FB	Josh Hokit	Fresno State	Released on September 5
S	Jared Mayden	Alabama	Released on September 5
QB	Broc Rutter	North Central	Waived on July 28
RB	Salvon Ahmed	Washington	Waived on August 25
S	Evan Foster	Syracuse	Released on September 5

== Staff ==
2020 San Francisco 49ers staff
Front office: Co-chairman – Denise DeBartolo York; Co-chairman – John York; Chief executive officer – Jed York; Co-owner – John M. Sobrato; Co-owner – Mark Wan; Co-owner – Gideon Yu; General manager – John Lynch; President of 49ers enterprises and EVP of football operations – Paraag Marathe; President – Al Guido; General counsel – Hannah Gordon; Chief investment officer – Brano Perkovich; Chief financial officer – Scott Sabatino; Vice president of player personnel – Adam Peters; Vice president of player personnel – Martin Mayhew; Vice president and senior advisor to the general manager – Keena Turner; Director of pro personnel – Ran Carthon; Director of college scouting – Ethan Waugh; Director of football administration & analytics – Brian Hampton; Head coaches: Head coach – Kyle Shanahan; Assistant head coach/tight ends – Jon Embree; Offensive coaches: Passing game coordinator – Mike LaFleur; Run game coordinator – Mike McDaniel; Quarterbacks – Shane Day; Running backs – Bobby Turner; Wide receivers – Wes Welker; Offensive line – John Benton; Assistant offensive line – Chris Foerster; Assistant offensive line – Zach Yenser; Offensive assistant – Bobby Slowik; Offensive assistant – Katie Sowers; Offensive quality control – Brian Fleury	Defensive coaches: Defensive coordinator – Robert Saleh; Defensive line – Kris Kocurek; Assistant defensive line – Aaron Whitecotton; Run game specialist/outside linebackers – Johnny Holland; Inside linebackers – DeMeco Ryans; Defensive backs/cornerbacks – Tony Oden; Safeties – Daniel Bullocks; Passing game specialist – Mike Rutenberg; Special teams coaches: Special teams coordinator – Richard Hightower; Assistant special teams – Michael Clay; Assistant special teams – Stan Kwan; Strength and conditioning: Head strength and conditioning – Dustin Perry; Assistant strength and conditioning – Aaron Hill; Assistant strength and conditioning – Shea Thompson; Assistant strength and conditioning – Mike Nicolini

== Final roster ==
2020 San Francisco 49ers roster
Quarterbacks (QB): 3 C. J. Beathard; 2 Josh Rosen; Running backs (RB): 26 Tevin Coleman; 44 Kyle Juszczyk FB; 28 Jerick McKinnon; 48 Austin Walter; 30 Jeff Wilson; Wide receivers (WR): 11 Brandon Aiyuk; 84 Kendrick Bourne; 86 River Cracraft; 17 Matt Cole; 13 Richie James; 19 Deebo Samuel; Tight ends (TE): 82 Ross Dwelley; 85 George Kittle; 81 Jordan Reed; 89 Charlie Woerner	Offensive linemen (OL): 62 Tony Bergstrom C; 60 Daniel Brunskill C; 66 Tom Compton G; 69 Mike McGlinchey T; 68 Colton McKivitz G; 67 Justin Skule G; 75 Laken Tomlinson G; Defensive linemen (DL): 91 Arik Armstead DE; 64 Alex Barrett DE; 65 Darrion Daniels DT; 90 Kevin Givens DT; 92 Kerry Hyder DE; 93 D. J. Jones DT; 96 Dion Jordan DE; 99 Javon Kinlaw DT; 95 Kentavius Street DT	Linebackers (LB): 51 Azeez Al-Shaair OLB; 45 Demetrius Flannigan-Fowles OLB; 57 Dre Greenlaw OLB; 53 Mark Nzeocha OLB; 54 Fred Warner MLB; 59 Joe Walker OLB; Defensive backs (DB): 36 Marcell Harris SS; 27 Dontae Johnson CB; 33 Tarvarius Moore SS; 41 Emmanuel Moseley CB; 43 Kai Nacua FS; 25 Richard Sherman CB; 22 Jason Verrett CB; 20 Jimmie Ward FS; 24 K'Waun Williams CB; 23 Ahkello Witherspoon CB; Special teams (ST): 40 Colin Holba LS; 6 Mitch Wishnowsky P	Practice squad: 47 Briean Boddy-Calhoun CB; 76 Josiah Coatney DT; 38 Chris Edwards S; 32 Tyler Gaffney RB; 5 Jonas Griffith LB; 77 Daeshon Hall DE; 83 Chase Harrell TE (COVID-19); 35 Tim Harris CB; 88 Daniel Helm TE; 40 Josh Hokit FB; -- Jauan Jennings WR (PS/I); 1 Josh Johnson QB; 5 Drew Kaser P; 18 Jordan Matthews WR; 43 Jared Mayden SS (PS/I); 1 Shawn Poindexter WR (PS/I); 61 Dakoda Shepley G; 7 Tristan Vizcaino K; 14 Kevin White WR; 76 Isaiah Williams T; Reserve: 94 Ezekiel Ansah DE (IR); -- Travis Benjamin WR (Opt-out); 98 Ronald Blair DE (PUP); 97 Nick Bosa DE (IR); 64 Jake Brendel C (Opt-out); 78 Shon Coleman T (Opt-out); 55 Dee Ford DE (IR); 63 Ben Garland C (IR); 10 Jimmy Garoppolo QB (IR/DFR); 9 Robbie Gould K (COVID-19); 50 Hroniss Grasu C (COVID-19); 38 JaMycal Hasty RB (IR); 14 Jalen Hurd WR (IR); 31 Raheem Mostert RB (IR); 4 Nick Mullens QB (IR); 46 Taybor Pepper LS (COVID-19); 58 Weston Richburg C (PUP); 29 Jaquiski Tartt SS (IR); 47 Jamar Taylor CB (IR); 15 Trent Taylor WR (COVID-19); 94 Solomon Thomas DT (IR); 2 Chris Thompson WR (IR); 40 Ken Webster CB (IR); 71 Trent Williams T (IR); 78 Jordan Willis DE (IR); Rookies in italics 51 active, 25 reserve, 16 practice squad (4 exempt)

== Preseason ==
The 49ers' preseason schedule was announced on May 7, but was later canceled due to the COVID-19 pandemic.

Week	Date	Opponent	Venue	Result
1	August 15	at Denver Broncos	Empower Field at Mile High	Canceled due to the COVID-19 pandemic
2	August 21	Las Vegas Raiders	Levi's Stadium	Canceled due to the COVID-19 pandemic
3	August 29	at Chicago Bears	Soldier Field	Canceled due to the COVID-19 pandemic
4	September 3	Los Angeles Chargers	Levi's Stadium	Canceled due to the COVID-19 pandemic

== Regular season ==
=== Schedule ===
The 49ers' 2020 schedule was announced on May 7.

Week	Date	Opponent	Result	Record	Venue	Recap
1	September 13	**Arizona Cardinals**	**L** 20–24	0–1	Levi's Stadium	Recap
2	September 20	at New York Jets	**W** 31–13	1–1	MetLife Stadium	Recap
3	September 27	at New York Giants	**W** 36–9	2–1	MetLife Stadium	Recap
4	October 4	Philadelphia Eagles	**L** 20–25	2–2	Levi's Stadium	Recap
5	October 11	Miami Dolphins	**L** 17–43	2–3	Levi's Stadium	Recap
6	October 18	**Los Angeles Rams**	**W** 24–16	3–3	Levi's Stadium	Recap
7	October 25	at New England Patriots	**W** 33–6	4–3	Gillette Stadium	Recap
8	November 1	at **Seattle Seahawks**	**L** 27–37	4–4	CenturyLink Field	Recap
9	November 5	Green Bay Packers	**L** 17–34	4–5	Levi's Stadium	Recap
10	November 15	at New Orleans Saints	**L** 13–27	4–6	Mercedes-Benz Superdome	Recap
11	Bye					
12	November 29	at **Los Angeles Rams**	**W** 23–20	5–6	SoFi Stadium	Recap
13	December 7	Buffalo Bills	**L** 24–34	5–7	State Farm Stadium	Recap
14	December 13	Washington Football Team	**L** 15–23	5–8	State Farm Stadium	Recap
15	December 20	at Dallas Cowboys	**L** 33–41	5–9	AT&T Stadium	Recap
16	December 26	at **Arizona Cardinals**	**W** 20–12	6–9	State Farm Stadium	Recap
17	January 3, 2021	**Seattle Seahawks**	**L** 23–26	6–10	State Farm Stadium	Recap
Note: Intra-division opponents are in **bold** text.

=== Game summaries ===
==== Week 1: vs. Arizona Cardinals ====
Week One: Arizona Cardinals at San Francisco 49ers – Game summary

Quarter	1	2	3	4	Total
**Cardinals**	7	3	0	14	**24**
49ers	10	3	0	7	**20**

at Levi's Stadium, Santa Clara, California

- Date: September 13
- Game time: 1:25 p.m. PDT
- Game weather: Hazy, 66 °F (19 °C)
- Game attendance: 0
- Referee: Carl Cheffers
- TV announcers (Fox): Kevin Kugler, Chris Spielman and Laura Okmin
- Recap, Game Book

Game information

**First quarter**

- SF – Robbie Gould 52-yard field goal, 11:50. 49ers 3–0. **Drive: 6 plays, 41 yards, 3:10.**
- SF – Raheem Mostert 76-yard pass from Jimmy Garoppolo (Robbie Gould kick), 9:53. 49ers 10–0. **Drive: 1 plays, 76 yards, 0:12.**
- ARI – Chase Edmonds 10-yard pass from Kyler Murray (Zane Gonzalez kick), 6:55. 49ers 10–7. **Drive: 1 plays, 10 yards, 0:10.**

**Second quarter**

- SF – Robbie Gould 24-yard field goal, 0:30. 49ers 13–7. **Drive: 6 plays, 20 yards, 1:59.**
- ARI – Zane Gonzalez 56-yard field goal, 0:00. 49ers 13–10. **Drive: 6 plays, 37 yards, 0:30.**

**Third quarter**

- No scoring plays.

**Fourth quarter**

- ARI – Kyler Murray 22-yard run (Zane Gonzalez kick), 10:26. Cardinals 17–13. **Drive: 14 plays, 94 yards, 6:48.**
- SF – Jerick McKinnon 5-yard pass from Jimmy Garoppolo (Robbie Gould kick), 8:38. 49ers 20–17. **Drive: 6 plays, 78 yards, 1:48.**
- ARI – Kenyan Drake 1-yard run (Zane Gonzalez kick), 5:03. Cardinals 24–20. **Drive: 9 plays, 75 yards, 3:35.**

**Top passers**

- ARI – Kyler Murray – 26/40, 230 yards, TD, INT
- SF – Jimmy Garoppolo – 19/33, 259 yards, 2 TD

**Top rushers**

- ARI – Kyler Murray – 13 rushes, 91 yards, TD
- SF – Raheem Mostert – 15 rushes, 56 yards

**Top receivers**

- ARI – DeAndre Hopkins – 14 receptions, 151 yards
- SF – Raheem Mostert – 4 receptions, 95 yards, TD

With this loss, the defending NFC Champions started off 0-1.

==== Week 2: at New York Jets ====
Week Two: San Francisco 49ers at New York Jets – Game summary

Quarter	1	2	3	4	Total
**49ers**	7	14	3	7	**31**
Jets	3	0	3	7	**13**

at MetLife Stadium, East Rutherford, New Jersey

- Date: September 20
- Game time: 1:00 p.m. EDT/10:00 am. PDT
- Game weather: Mostly sunny, 61 °F (16 °C)
- Game attendance: 0
- Referee: Ronald Torbert
- TV announcers (Fox): Brandon Gaudin, Jonathan Vilma and Shannon Spake
- Recap, Game Book

Game information

**First quarter**

- SF – Raheem Mostert 80-yard run (Robbie Gould kick), 14:43. 49ers 7–0. **Drive: 1 play, 80 yards, 0:17.**
- NYJ – Sam Ficken 41-yard field goal, 3:43. 49ers 7–3. **Drive: 13 plays, 38 yards, 6:43.**

**Second quarter**

- SF – Jordan Reed 18-yard pass from Jimmy Garoppolo (Robbie Gould kick), 9:55. 49ers 14–3. **Drive: 14 plays, 77 yards, 8:44.**
- SF – Jordan Reed 4-yard pass from Jimmy Garoppolo (Robbie Gould kick), 0:11. 49ers 21–3. **Drive: 13 plays, 80 yards, 3:30.**

**Third quarter**

- SF – Robbie Gould 46-yard field goal, 8:53. 49ers 24–3. **Drive: 7 plays, 40 yards, 4:41.**
- NYJ – Sam Ficken 25-yard field goal, 2:52. 49ers 24–6. **Drive: 5 plays, 15 yards, 1:50.**

**Fourth quarter**

- SF – Jerick McKinnon 18-yard run (Robbie Gould kick), 10:23. 49ers 31–6. **Drive: 4 plays, 75 yards, 2:39.**
- NYJ – Braxton Berrios 30-yard pass from Sam Darnold (Sam Ficken kick), 1:23. 49ers 31–13. **Drive: 7 plays, 80 yards, 1:34.**

**Top passers**

- SF – Jimmy Garoppolo – 14/16, 131 yards, 2 TD
- NYJ – Sam Darnold – 21/32, 179 yards, TD

**Top rushers**

- SF – Raheem Mostert – 8 rushes, 92 yards, TD
- NYJ – Frank Gore – 21 rushes, 63 yards

**Top receivers**

- SF – Kendrick Bourne – 4 receptions, 67 yards
- NYJ – Chris Hogan – 6 receptions, 75 yards

Although the 49ers won easily over the struggling Jets, they suffered devastating injuries on both sides of the ball to Jimmy Garoppolo, Raheem Mostert, Tevin Coleman, Nick Bosa, and Solomon Thomas. It got so bad the team's MRI truck broke down. The win brought the 49ers to 1-1 on the season.

==== Week 3: at New York Giants ====
Week Three: San Francisco 49ers at New York Giants – Game summary

Quarter	1	2	3	4	Total
**49ers**	6	10	7	13	**36**
Giants	0	6	3	0	**9**

at MetLife Stadium, East Rutherford, New Jersey

- Date: September 27
- Game time: 1:00 pm. EDT/10:00 am. PDT
- Game weather: Mostly cloudy, 75 °F (24 °C)
- Game attendance: 0
- Referee: Clay Martin
- TV announcers (Fox): Kevin Burkhardt, Daryl Johnston and Pam Oliver
- Recap, Game Book

Game information

**First quarter**

- SF – Robbie Gould 52-yard field goal, 9:43. 49ers 3–0. **Drive: 10 plays, 41 yards, 5:17.**
- SF – Robbie Gould 32-yard field goal, 1:05. 49ers 6–0. **Drive: 12 plays, 28 yards, 5:22.**

**Second quarter**

- NYG – Graham Gano 52-yard field goal, 13:35. 49ers 6–3. **Drive: 7 plays, 41 yards, 2:30.**
- NYG – Graham Gano 42-yard field goal, 7:30. Tied 6–6. **Drive: 6 plays, 31 yards, 1:37.**
- SF – Jerick McKinnon 10-yard run (Robbie Gould kick), 1:07. 49ers 13–6. **Drive: 12 plays, 75 yards, 6:18.**
- SF – Robbie Gould 26-yard field goal, 0:06. 49ers 16–6. **Drive: 4 plays, 24 yards, 0:53.**

**Third quarter**

- NYG – Graham Gano 47-yard field goal, 8:11. 49ers 16–9. **Drive: 13 plays, 53 yards, 6:49.**
- SF – Brandon Aiyuk 19-yard run (Robbie Gould kick), 3:14. 49ers 23–9. **Drive: 8 plays, 75 yards, 4:52.**

**Fourth quarter**

- SF – Jeff Wilson 19-yard pass from Nick Mullens (pass failed), 13:28. 49ers 29–9. **Drive: 4 plays, 30 yards, 2:16.**
- SF – Jeff Wilson 2-yard run (Robbie Gould Kick), 3:35. 49ers 36–9. **Drive: 15 plays, 92 yards, 8:21.**

**Top passers**

- SF – Nick Mullens – 25/36, 343 yards, TD
- NYG – Daniel Jones – 17/32, 179 yards, INT

**Top rushers**

- SF – Jerick McKinnon – 14 rushes, 38 yards, TD
- NYG – Daniel Jones – 5 rushes, 49 yards

**Top receivers**

- SF – Brandon Aiyuk – 5 receptions, 70 yards
- NYG – Darius Slayton – 3 receptions, 53 yards

With Jimmy Garoppolo sidelined, Nick Mullens made his first start since 2018. He threw for 343 yards and a touchdown in a blowout win over the Giants, bringing the 49ers up to 2-1 for the season.

==== Week 4: vs. Philadelphia Eagles ====
Week Four: Philadelphia Eagles at San Francisco 49ers – Game summary

Quarter	1	2	3	4	Total
**Eagles**	8	0	3	14	**25**
49ers	7	0	7	6	**20**

at Levi's Stadium, Santa Clara, California

- Date: October 4
- Game time: 5:20 pm. PDT
- Game weather: Sunny, 84 °F (29 °C)
- Game attendance: 0
- Referee: Bill Vinovich
- TV announcers (NBC): Al Michaels, Cris Collinsworth, and Michele Tafoya
- Recap, Game Book

Game information

**First quarter**

- PHI – Carson Wentz 11-yard run (Carson Wentz–Zach Ertz pass), 3:51. Eagles 8–0. **Drive: 8 plays, 78 yards, 4:03.**
- SF – Brandon Aiyuk 38-yard run (Robbie Gould kick), 0:21. Eagles 8–7. **Drive: 6 plays, 75 yards, 3:30.**

**Second quarter**

- No scoring plays.

**Third quarter**

- SF – George Kittle 5-yard pass from Nick Mullens (Robbie Gould kick), 8:26. 49ers 14–8. **Drive: 12 plays, 75 yards, 6:34.**
- PHI – Jake Elliott 35-yard field goal, 0:55. 49ers 14–11. **Drive: 16 plays, 62 yards, 7:31.**

**Fourth quarter**

- PHI – Travis Fulgham 42-yard pass from Carson Wentz (Jake Elliott kick), 5:50. Eagles 18–14. **Drive: 12 plays, 75 yards, 6:34.**
- PHI – Alex Singleton 30-yard interception return (Jake Elliott kick), 5:42. Eagles 25–14.
- SF – Jerick McKinnon 1-yard run (pass failed), 2:02. Eagles 25–20. **Drive: 12 plays, 75 yards, 3:40.**

**Top passers**

- PHI – Carson Wentz – 18/28, 193 yards, TD, INT
- SF – Nick Mullens – 18/26, 200 yards, TD, 2 INT

**Top rushers**

- PHI – Miles Sanders – 13 rushes, 46 yards
- SF – Jerick McKinnon – 14 rushes, 54 yards, TD

**Top receivers**

- PHI – Travis Fulgham – 2 receptions, 57 yards, TD
- SF – George Kittle – 15 receptions, 183 yards, TD

With this loss, the 49ers dropped to 2–2. Nick Mullens struggled mightily in the game with two interceptions, one of which was returned by Alex Singleton for a touchdown, and was benched afterwards for C. J. Beathard. The 49ers drove all the way to within field goal range down by 5, but the clock ran out.

==== Week 5: vs. Miami Dolphins ====
Week Five: Miami Dolphins at San Francisco 49ers – Game summary

Quarter	1	2	3	4	Total
**Dolphins**	14	16	7	6	**43**
49ers	0	7	10	0	**17**

at Levi's Stadium, Santa Clara, California

- Date: October 11
- Game time: 1:05 pm. PDT
- Game weather: Sunny, 73 °F (23 °C)
- Game attendance: 0
- Referee: Land Clark
- TV announcers (Fox): Adam Amin, Mark Schlereth and Lindsay Czarniak
- Recap, Game Book

Game information

**First quarter**

- MIA – Adam Shaheen 3-yard pass from Ryan Fitzpatrick (Jason Sanders kick), 10:45. Dolphins 7–0. **Drive: 7 plays, 79 yards, 2:52.**
- MIA – Myles Gaskin 1-yard run (Jason Sanders kick), 4:14. Dolphins 14–0. **Drive: 7 plays, 56 yards, 3:19.**

**Second quarter**

- SF – Kyle Juszczyk 7-yard run (Robbie Gould kick), 12:07. Dolphins 14–7. **Drive: 3 plays, 49 yards, 1:18.**
- MIA – DeVante Parker 22-yard pass from Ryan Fitzpatrick (Jason Sanders kick), 7:29. Dolphins 21–7. **Drive: 7 plays, 78 yards, 4:38.**
- MIA – Jason Sanders 26-yard field goal, 2:00. Dolphins 24–7. **Drive: 6 plays, 71 yards, 2:40.**
- MIA – Jason Sanders 50-yard field goal, 0:38. Dolphins 27–7. **Drive: 4 plays, 5 yards, 1:03.**
- MIA – Jason Sanders 29-yard field goal, 0:00. Dolphins 30–7. **Drive: 3 plays, 8 yards, 0:14.**

**Third quarter**

- SF – Kendrick Bourne 19-yard pass from C. J. Beathard (Robbie Gould kick), 8:07. Dolphins 30–14. **Drive: 9 plays, 74 yards, 3:20.**
- MIA – Preston Williams 32-yard pass from Ryan Fitzpatrick (Jason Sanders kick), 4:42. Dolphins 37–14. **Drive: 7 plays, 75 yards, 3:25.**
- SF – Robbie Gould 37-yard field goal, 0:46. Dolphins 37–17. **Drive: 9 plays, 56 yards, 3:56.**

**Fourth quarter**

- MIA – Jason Sanders 31-yard field goal, 8:40. Dolphins 40–17. **Drive: 9 plays, 62 yards, 7:06.**
- MIA – Jason Sanders 49-yard field goal, 5:52. Dolphins 43–17. **Drive: 4 plays, 2 yards, 1:40.**

**Top passers**

- MIA – Ryan Fitzpatrick – 22/28, 350 yards, 3 TD
- SF – C. J. Beathard – 9/18, 94 yards, TD

**Top rushers**

- MIA – Myles Gaskin – 16 rushes, 57 yards, TD
- SF – Raheem Mostert – 11 rushes, 90 yards

**Top receivers**

- MIA – Preston Williams – 4 receptions, 106 yards, TD
- SF – George Kittle – 4 receptions, 44 yards

With this embarrassing loss, the 49ers dropped to 2–3, already matching last season's loss total. Jimmy Garoppolo returned from injury but struggled mightily with 2 interceptions, leading to him being benched at halftime for C. J. Beathard.

==== Week 6: vs. Los Angeles Rams ====
Week Six: Los Angeles Rams at San Francisco 49ers – Game summary

Quarter	1	2	3	4	Total
Rams	0	6	3	7	**16**
**49ers**	7	14	0	3	**24**

at Levi's Stadium, Santa Clara, California

- Date: October 18
- Game time: 5:20 pm. PDT
- Game weather: Sunny, 86 °F (30 °C)
- Game attendance: 0
- Referee: Carl Cheffers
- TV announcers (NBC): Al Michaels, Cris Collinsworth and Michele Tafoya
- Recap, Game Book

Game information

**First quarter**

- SF – Deebo Samuel 6-yard pass from Jimmy Garoppolo (Robbie Gould kick), 11:39. 49ers 7–0. **Drive: 6 plays, 76 yards, 3:21.**

**Second quarter**

- SF – George Kittle 44-yard pass from Jimmy Garoppolo (Robbie Gould kick), 14:14. 49ers 14–0. **Drive: 10 plays, 87 yards, 6:08.**
- LAR – Robert Woods 10-yard pass from Jared Goff (kick blocked), 9:03. 49ers 14–6. **Drive: 10 plays, 64 yards, 5:11.**
- SF – Brandon Aiyuk 2-yard pass from Jimmy Garoppolo (Robbie Gould kick), 1:47. 49ers 21–6. **Drive: 13 plays, 75 yards, 7:16.**

**Third quarter**

- LAR – Samuel Sloman 42-yard field goal, 12:06. 49ers 21–9. **Drive: 7 plays, 48 yards, 2:54.**

**Fourth quarter**

- SF – Robbie Gould 49-yard field goal, 5:26. 49ers 24–9. **Drive: 7 plays, 20 yards, 3:15.**
- LAR – Josh Reynolds 40-yard pass from Jared Goff (Sam Sloman kick), 3:24. 49ers 24–16. **Drive: 10 plays, 79 yards, 2:02.**

**Top passers**

- LAR – Jared Goff – 19/38, 198 yards, 2 TD, INT
- SF – Jimmy Garoppolo – 23/33, 268 yards, 3 TD

**Top rushers**

- LAR – Darrell Henderson – 14 rushes, 88 yards
- SF – Raheem Mostert – 17 rushes, 65 yards

**Top receivers**

- LAR – Tyler Higbee – 3 receptions, 56 yards
- SF – George Kittle – 7 receptions, 109 yards, TD

The 49ers bounced back from the previous week. Jimmy Garoppolo threw 3 touchdowns and 268 yards and the 49ers defense was able to hold a red-hot Rams offense in check. With this win, they improved to 3–3, and won their third straight meeting against the Rams.

==== Week 7: at New England Patriots ====
Week Seven: San Francisco 49ers at New England Patriots – Game summary

Quarter	1	2	3	4	Total
**49ers**	7	16	7	3	**33**
Patriots	0	3	3	0	**6**

at Gillette Stadium, Foxborough, Massachusetts

- Date: October 25
- Game time: 4:25 pm. EDT/1:25 pm. PDT
- Game weather: Cloudy, 49 °F (9 °C)
- Game attendance: 0
- Referee: Shawn Smith
- TV announcers (CBS): Jim Nantz, Tony Romo and Tracy Wolfson
- Recap, Game Book

Game information

**First quarter**

- SF – Jeff Wilson 3-yard run (Robbie Gould kick), 9:56. 49ers 7–0. **Drive: 9 plays, 75 yards, 5:04.**

**Second quarter**

- NE – Nick Folk 40-yard field goal, 14:56. 49ers 7–3. **Drive: 6 plays, 30 yards, 2:06.**
- SF – Robbie Gould 41-yard field goal, 9:00. 49ers 10–3. **Drive: 10 plays, 56 yards, 5:56.**
- SF – Kyle Juszczyk 4-yard run (kick failed), 6:23. 49ers 16–3. **Drive: 5 plays, 38 yards, 2:23.**
- SF – Jeff Wilson 16-yard run (Robbie Gould kick), 0:59. 49ers 23–3. **Drive: 7 plays, 84 yards, 3:43.**

**Third quarter**

- NE – Nick Folk 41-yard field goal, 10:48. 49ers 23–6. **Drive: 8 plays, 50 yards, 4:12.**
- SF – Jeff Wilson 7-yard run (Robbie Gould kick), 7:32. 49ers 30–6. **Drive: 6 plays, 79 yards, 3:16.**

**Fourth quarter**

- SF – Robbie Gould 32-yard field goal, 13:27. 49ers 33–6. **Drive: 10 plays, 55 yards, 6:20.**

**Top passers**

- SF – Jimmy Garoppolo – 20/25, 277 yards, 2 INT
- NE – Cam Newton – 9/15, 98 yards, 3 INT

**Top rushers**

- SF – Jeff Wilson – 17 rushes, 112 yards, 3 TD
- NE – Damien Harris – 10 rushes, 58 yards

**Top receivers**

- SF – Brandon Aiyuk – 6 receptions, 115 yards
- NE – Jakobi Meyers – 4 receptions, 60 yards

This was quarterback Jimmy Garoppolo's first return to New England since the Patriots traded him to the 49ers in October 2017. Garoppolo played for the Patriots from 2014 to 2017, and was part of their 2014 and 2016 Super Bowl-winning teams. Jimmy's victorious return brought the 49ers up to 4-3 on the season.

==== Week 8: at Seattle Seahawks ====
Week Eight: San Francisco 49ers at Seattle Seahawks – Game summary

Quarter	1	2	3	4	Total
49ers	0	7	0	20	**27**
**Seahawks**	6	7	14	10	**37**

at CenturyLink Field, Seattle, Washington

- Date: November 1
- Game time: 1:25 pm. PST
- Game weather: Sunny, 55 °F (13 °C)
- Game attendance: 0
- Referee: Craig Wrolstad
- TV announcers (Fox): Chris Myers, Mark Schlereth and Lindsay Czarniak
- Recap, Game Book

Game information

**First quarter**

- SEA – DK Metcalf 46-yard pass from Russell Wilson (kick failed), 0:00. Seahawks 6–0. **Drive: 7 plays, 86 yards, 4:06.**

**Second quarter**

- SF – JaMycal Hasty 1-yard run (Robbie Gould kick), 6:59. 49ers 7–6. **Drive: 14 plays, 75 yards, 8:01.**
- SEA – DK Metcalf 2-yard pass from Russell Wilson (Jason Myers kick), 3:04. Seahawks 13–7. **Drive: 8 plays, 81 yards, 3:55.**

**Third quarter**

- SEA – DeeJay Dallas 2-yard pass from Russell Wilson (Jason Myers kick), 8:02. Seahawks 20–7. **Drive: 9 plays, 63 yards, 5:01.**
- SEA – David Moore 6-yard pass from Russell Wilson (Jason Myers kick), 5:51. Seahawks 27–7. **Drive: 6 plays, 21 yards, 2:07.**

**Fourth quarter**

- SEA – Jason Myers 48-yard field goal, 14:07. Seahawks 30–7. **Drive: 9 plays, 46 yards, 4:39.**
- SF – Jerick McKinnon 1-yard run (Robbie Gould kick), 9:36. Seahawks 30–14. **Drive: 11 plays, 79 yards, 4:31.**
- SF – Ross Dwelley 16-yard pass from Nick Mullens (pass failed), 4:16. Seahawks 30–20. **Drive: 6 plays, 80 yards, 2:06.**
- SEA – DeeJay Dallas 1-yard run (Jason Myers kick), 3:33. Seahawks 37–20. **Drive: 8 plays, 47 yards, 0:43.**
- SF – Brandon Aiyuk 3-yard pass from Nick Mullens (Robbie Gould kick), 1:52. Seahawks 37–27. **Drive: 9 plays, 81 yards, 1:41.**

**Top passers**

- SF – Nick Mullens – 18/25, 238 yards, 2 TD
- SEA – Russell Wilson – 27/37, 261 yards, 4 TD

**Top rushers**

- SF – JaMycal Hasty – 12 rushes, 29 yards, TD
- SEA – DeeJay Dallas – 18 rushes, 41 yards, TD

**Top receivers**

- SF – Brandon Aiyuk – 8 receptions, 91 yards, TD
- SEA – DK Metcalf – 12 receptions, 161 yards, 2 TD

At one point, the 49ers were down 7-30. Despite outscoring the Seahawks 20-7 for the rest of the game, the 49ers dropped to 4-4.

==== Week 9: vs. Green Bay Packers ====
Week Nine: Green Bay Packers at San Francisco 49ers – Game summary

Quarter	1	2	3	4	Total
**Packers**	7	14	10	3	**34**
49ers	3	0	0	14	**17**

at Levi's Stadium, Santa Clara, California

- Date: November 5
- Game time: 5:20 pm. PST
- Game weather: Sunny, 78 °F (26 °C)
- Game attendance: 0
- Referee: Bill Vinovich
- TV announcers (Fox/NFLN/Amazon Prime Video/Twitch): Joe Buck, Troy Aikman, Erin Andrews and Kristina Pink
- Recap, Game Book

Game information

**First quarter**

- GB – Davante Adams 36-yard pass from Aaron Rodgers (Mason Crosby kick), 11:42. Packers 7–0. **Drive: 6 plays, 75 yards, 3:18.**
- SF – Robbie Gould 22-yard field goal, 0:47. Packers 7–3. **Drive: 11 plays, 76 yards, 6:11.**

**Second quarter**

- GB – Marcedes Lewis 1-yard pass from Aaron Rodgers (Mason Crosby kick), 7:01. Packers 14–3. **Drive: 9 plays, 38 yards, 4:41.**
- GB – Marquez Valdes-Scantling 52-yard pass from Aaron Rodgers (Mason Crosby kick), 1:53. Packers 21–3. **Drive: 8 plays, 87 yards, 3:33.**

**Third quarter**

- GB – Marquez Valdes-Scantling 1-yard pass from Aaron Rodgers (Mason Crosby kick), 7:17. Packers 28–3. **Drive: 9 plays, 80 yards, 6:00.**
- GB – Mason Crosby 19-yard field goal, 2:01. Packers 31–3. **Drive: 7 plays, 46 yards, 3:26.**

**Fourth quarter**

- GB – Mason Crosby 53-yard field goal, 6:15. Packers 34–3. **Drive: 12 plays, 60 yards, 8:14.**
- SF – Richie James 41-yard pass from Nick Mullens (Robbie Gould kick), 5:00. Packers 34–10. **Drive: 4 plays, 80 yards, 1:15.**
- SF – Jerick McKinnon 1-yard run (Robbie Gould kick), 0:04. Packers 34–17. **Drive: 10 plays, 75 yards, 2:35.**

**Top passers**

- GB – Aaron Rodgers – 25/31, 305 yards, 4 TD
- SF – Nick Mullens – 22/35, 291 yards, TD, INT

**Top rushers**

- GB – Aaron Jones – 15 rushes, 58 yards
- SF – Jerick McKinnon – 12 rushes, 52 yards, TD

**Top receivers**

- GB – Davante Adams – 10 receptions, 173 yards, TD
- SF – Richie James – 9 receptions, 184 yards, TD

In a rematch of the NFC Championship the previous season. Aaron Rodgers threw for 305 yards and 4 touchdowns as the Packers went up 34–3 before the 49ers scored two meaningless touchdowns to make the final score 34–17 and dropping the 49ers to 4–5. As of week 9, the 49ers have a league high 24 players on the reserve lists. Due to COVID-19 pandemic restrictions, this would be the final game at Levi's Stadium for the season.

==== Week 10: at New Orleans Saints ====
Week Ten: San Francisco 49ers at New Orleans Saints – Game summary

Quarter	1	2	3	4	Total
49ers	7	3	0	3	**13**
**Saints**	0	17	0	10	**27**

at Mercedes-Benz Superdome, New Orleans, Louisiana

- Date: November 15
- Game time: 3:25 p.m. CST/1:25 pm. PST
- Game weather: None (indoor stadium)
- Game attendance: 5,979
- Referee: Brad Rogers
- TV announcers (Fox): Adam Amin, Mark Schlereth and Lindsay Czarniak
- Recap, Game Book

Game information

**First quarter**

- SF – Brandon Aiyuk 4-yard pass from Nick Mullens (Robbie Gould kick), 7:43. 49ers 7–0. **Drive: 13 plays, 75 yards, 7:17.**

**Second quarter**

- SF – Robbie Gould 32-yard field goal, 14:56. 49ers 10–0. **Drive: 8 plays, 35 yards, 4:44.**
- NO – Wil Lutz 49-yard field goal, 13:48. 49ers 10–3. **Drive: 4 plays, -6 yards, 1:08.**
- NO – Alvin Kamara 2-yard run (Wil Lutz kick), 6:48. Tied 10–10. **Drive: 4 plays, 21 yards, 2:33.**
- NO – Alvin Kamara 3-yard pass from Drew Brees (Wil Lutz kick), 1:15. Saints 17–10. **Drive: 6 plays, 57 yards, 0:35.**

**Third quarter**

- No scoring plays.

**Fourth quarter**

- NO – Wil Lutz 23-yard field goal, 12:15. Saints 20–10. **Drive: 12 plays, 59 yards, 6:06.**
- NO – Alvin Kamara 1-yard run (Wil Lutz kick), 7:29. Saints 27–10. **Drive: 3 plays, 22 yards, 1:30.**
- SF – Robbie Gould 40-yard field goal, 5:54. Saints 27–13. **Drive: 6 plays, 53 yards, 1:35.**

**Top passers**

- SF – Nick Mullens – 24/38, 247 yards, TD, 2 INT
- NO – Drew Brees – 8/13, 76 yards, TD

**Top rushers**

- SF – Jerick McKinnon – 18 rushes, 33 yards
- NO – Latavius Murray – 9 rushes, 57 yards

**Top receivers**

- SF – Brandon Aiyuk – 7 receptions, 75 yards, TD
- NO – Alvin Kamara – 7 receptions, 83 yards, TD

With the loss, the 49ers dropped to 4-6.

==== Week 12: at Los Angeles Rams ====
Week Twelve: San Francisco 49ers at Los Angeles Rams – Game summary

Quarter	1	2	3	4	Total
**49ers**	7	0	10	6	**23**
Rams	3	0	10	7	**20**

at SoFi Stadium, Inglewood, California

- Date: November 29
- Game time: 1:05 pm. PST
- Game weather: Sunny, 72 °F (22 °C)
- Game attendance: 0
- Referee: Scott Novak
- TV announcers (Fox): Chris Myers, Greg Jennings and Jen Hale
- Recap, Game Book

Game information

**First quarter**

- LAR – Matt Gay 48-yard field goal, 6:52. Rams 3–0. **Drive: 6 plays, 41 yards, 2:19.**
- SF – Raheem Mostert 8-yard run (Robbie Gould kick), 4:10. 49ers 7–3. **Drive: 5 plays, 75 yards, 2:42.**

**Second quarter**

- No scoring plays.

**Third quarter**

- SF – Javon Kinlaw 27-yard interception return (Robbie Gould kick), 14:22. 49ers 14–3.
- SF – Robbie Gould 46-yard field goal, 4:30. 49ers 17–3. **Drive: 10 plays, 55 yards, 5:36.**
- LAR – Matt Gay 41-yard field goal, 2:38. 49ers 17–6. **Drive: 7 plays, 53 yards, 1:52.**
- LAR – Troy Hill 20-yard fumble return (Matt Gay kick), 2:32. 49ers 17–13.

**Fourth quarter**

- LAR – Cam Akers 1-yard run (Matt Gay kick), 14:17. Rams 20–17. **Drive: 3 plays, 68 yards, 1:15.**
- SF – Robbie Gould 44-yard field goal, 3:11. Tied 20–20. **Drive: 10 plays, 49 yards, 5:34.**
- SF – Robbie Gould 42-yard field goal, 0:00. 49ers 23–20. **Drive: 11 plays, 56 yards, 2:10.**

**Top passers**

- SF – Nick Mullens – 24/35, 252 yards, INT
- LAR – Jared Goff – 19/31, 198 yards, 2 INT

**Top rushers**

- SF – Raheem Mostert – 16 rushes, 43 yards, TD
- LAR – Cam Akers – 9 rushes, 84 yards, TD

**Top receivers**

- SF – Deebo Samuel – 11 receptions, 133 yards
- LAR – Robert Woods – 7 receptions, 80 yards

The 49ers returned from their bye week with some much-needed reinforcement returning from injury: on offense, Raheem Mostert scored a touchdown and 43 yards rushing and Deebo Samuel had 133 receiving yards; on defense, Richard Sherman contributed by grabbing his first interception of the season. The game was largely a defensive struggle. The two teams had four combined turnovers in the first quarter, and the only points scored in the first half came on a Raheem Mostert touchdown and a Matt Gay field goal. Early in the third quarter, the 49ers padded their lead to fourteen points with Javon Kinlaw's pick six and a Robbie Gould field goal. However, the momentum changed quickly as Aaron Donald forced a fumble on Raheem Mostert and it was returned for a touchdown by Troy Hill. The Rams soon scored again on a touchdown run from Cam Akers to take a three-point lead. The Rams' final drives quickly turned to punts while Nick Mullens led the 49ers on two drives resulting in field goals, including the 42-yard game winner by Robbie Gould with no time on the clock.

With the win, the 49ers swept the Rams for the second straight year and bringing their record to 5-6.

==== Week 13: vs. Buffalo Bills ====
Week Thirteen: Buffalo Bills at San Francisco 49ers – Game summary

Quarter	1	2	3	4	Total
**Bills**	0	17	10	7	**34**
49ers	7	0	10	7	**24**

at State Farm Stadium, Glendale, Arizona

- Date: December 7
- Game time: 6:15 p.m. MST/5:15 pm. PST
- Game weather: None (retractable roof closed)
- Game attendance: 0
- Referee: Tony Corrente
- TV announcers (ESPN/ABC): Steve Levy, Brian Griese, Louis Riddick, Lisa Salters and John Parry
- Recap, Game Book

Game information

**First quarter**

- SF – Brandon Aiyuk 2-yard pass from Nick Mullens (Robbie Gould kick), 0:44. 49ers 7–0. **Drive: 3 plays, 3 yards, 0:40.**

**Second quarter**

- BUF – Cole Beasley 5-yard pass from Josh Allen (Tyler Bass kick), 13:02. Tied 7–7. **Drive: 5 plays, 77 yards, 2:42.**
- BUF – Dawson Knox 4-yard pass from Josh Allen (Tyler Bass kick), 2:41. Bills 14–7. **Drive: 14 plays, 69 yards, 7:49.**
- BUF – Tyler Bass 37-yard field goal, 0:00. Bills 17–7. **Drive: 7 plays, 71 yards, 1:05.**

**Third quarter**

- SF – Robbie Gould 45-yard field goal, 11:14. Bills 17–10. **Drive: 8 plays, 48 yards, 3:46.**
- BUF – Isaiah McKenzie 23-yard pass from Josh Allen (Tyler Bass kick), 5:48. Bills 24–10. **Drive: 11 plays, 75 yards, 5:26.**
- BUF – Tyler Bass 28-yard field goal, 3:09. Bills 27–10. **Drive: 4 plays, -4 yards, 2:19.**
- SF – Kyle Juszczyk 6-yard pass from Nick Mullens (Robbie Gould kick), 0:26. Bills 27–17. **Drive: 5 plays, 75 yards, 2:43.**

**Fourth quarter**

- BUF – Gabe Davis 28-yard pass from Josh Allen (Tyler Bass kick), 9:50. Bills 34–17. **Drive: 10 plays, 75 yards, 5:36.**
- SF – Jordan Reed 5-yard pass from Nick Mullens (Robbie Gould kick), 0:43. Bills 34–24. **Drive: 13 plays, 73 yards, 2:47.**

**Top passers**

- BUF – Josh Allen – 32/40, 375 yards, 4 TD
- SF – Nick Mullens – 26/39, 316 yards, 3 TD, 2 INT

**Top rushers**

- BUF – Devin Singletary – 18 rushes, 61 yards
- SF – Jeff Wilson – 7 rushes, 47 yards

**Top receivers**

- BUF – Cole Beasley – 9 receptions, 130 yards, TD
- SF – Brandon Aiyuk – 5 receptions, 95 yards, TD

Due to the COVID-19 pandemic in Santa Clara County halting all contact sports the 49ers decided to use State Farm Stadium for 2 games. However, the result dropped the 49ers to 5-7 on the season.

==== Week 14: vs. Washington Football Team ====
Week Fourteen: Washington Football Team at San Francisco 49ers – Game summary

Quarter	1	2	3	4	Total
**Washington**	0	13	10	0	**23**
49ers	7	0	0	8	**15**

at State Farm Stadium, Glendale, Arizona

- Date: December 13
- Game time: 2:25 pm. MST/1:25 pm. PST
- Game weather: None (retractable roof closed)
- Game attendance: 0
- Referee: Carl Cheffers
- TV announcers (Fox): Chris Myers, Greg Jennings, and Jen Hale
- Recap, Game Book

Game information

**First quarter**

- SF – Jeff Wilson 1-yard run (Robbie Gould kick), 0:47. 49ers 7–0. **Drive: 7 plays, 57 yards, 4:23.**

**Second quarter**

- WSH – Dustin Hopkins 51-yard field goal, 5:45. 49ers 7–3. **Drive: 7 plays, 29 yards, 3:49.**
- WSH – Dustin Hopkins 31-yard field goal, 3:06. 49ers 7–6. **Drive: 6 plays, 13 yards, 1:57.**
- WSH – Chase Young 47-yard fumble return (Dustin Hopkins kick), 0:58. Washington 13–7.

**Third quarter**

- WSH – Dustin Hopkins 21-yard field goal, 10:05. Washington 16–7. **Drive: 11 plays, 72 yards, 4:55.**
- WSH – Kamren Curl 76-yard interception return (Dustin Hopkins kick), 0:00. Washington 23–7.

**Fourth quarter**

- SF – Kyle Juszczyk 6-yard pass from Nick Mullens (Nick Mullens–Kendrick Bourne pass), 10:18. Washington 23–15. **Drive: 11 plays, 75 yards, 4:42.**

**Top passers**

- WSH – Alex Smith – 8/19, 57 yards, INT
- SF – Nick Mullens – 25/45, 260 yards, TD, INT

**Top rushers**

- WSH – J. D. McKissic – 11 rushes, 68 yards
- SF – Raheem Mostert – 14 rushes, 65 yards

**Top receivers**

- WSH – Logan Thomas – 6 receptions, 43 yards
- SF – Brandon Aiyuk – 10 receptions, 119 yards

In a game that saw a returning Alex Smith to face the team that drafted him for the final time and Smith's revenge dropped the 49ers to 5-8 on the season.

==== Week 15: at Dallas Cowboys ====
Week Fifteen: San Francisco 49ers at Dallas Cowboys – Game summary

Quarter	1	2	3	4	Total
49ers	7	7	10	9	**33**
**Cowboys**	14	3	7	17	**41**

at AT&T Stadium, Arlington, Texas

- Date: December 20
- Game time: 12:00 pm. CST/10:00 am. PST
- Game weather: 57 °F (14 °C) (retractable roof open)
- Game attendance: 30,092
- Referee: Land Clark
- TV announcers (CBS): Kevin Harlan, Trent Green and Melanie Collins
- Recap, Game Book

Game information

**First quarter**

- DAL – Tony Pollard 1-yard run (Greg Zuerlein kick), 9:34. Cowboys 7–0. **Drive: 5 plays, 22 yards, 2:24.**
- DAL – Michael Gallup 3-yard pass from Andy Dalton (Greg Zuerlein kick), 6:39. Cowboys 14–0. **Drive: 5 plays, 24 yards, 2:22.**
- SF – Jordan Reed 5-yard pass from Nick Mullens (Robbie Gould kick), 0:12. Cowboys 14–7. **Drive: 13 plays, 75 yards, 6:27.**

**Second quarter**

- DAL – Greg Zuerlein 48-yard field goal, 11:37. Cowboys 17–7. **Drive: 8 plays, 37 yards, 3:35.**
- SF – Brandon Aiyuk 2-yard pass from Nick Mullens (Robbie Gould kick), 5:00. Cowboys 17–14. **Drive: 13 plays, 75 yards, 6:37.**

**Third quarter**

- SF – Robbie Gould 41-yard field goal, 10:48. Tied 17–17. **Drive: 6 plays, 48 yards, 2:41.**
- DAL – Dalton Schultz 12-yard pass from Andy Dalton (Greg Zuerlein kick), 7:35. Cowboys 24–17. **Drive: 6 plays, 73 yards, 3:13.**
- SF – Jeff Wilson 1-yard run (Robbie Gould kick), 2:08. Tied 24–24. **Drive: 11 plays, 75 yards, 5:27.**

**Fourth quarter**

- DAL – Greg Zuerlein 46-yard field goal, 10:08. Cowboys 27–24. **Drive: 4 plays, 0 yards, 0:18.**
- DAL – Tony Pollard 40-yard run (Greg Zuerlein kick), 2:27. Cowboys 34–24. **Drive: 2 plays, 46 yards, 0:16.**
- SF – Robbie Gould 31-yard field goal, 0:40. Cowboys 34–27. **Drive: 10 plays, 62 yards, 1:47.**
- DAL – CeeDee Lamb 47-yard kick return (Greg Zuerlein kick), 0:34. Cowboys 41–27.
- SF – Kendrick Bourne 49-yard pass from C. J. Beathard, 0:00. Cowboys 41–33. **Drive: 3 plays, 75 yards, 0:34.**

**Top passers**

- SF – Nick Mullens – 21/36, 219 yards, 2 TD, 2 INT
- DAL – Andy Dalton – 19/33, 209 yards, 2 TD

**Top rushers**

- SF – Raheem Mostert – 14 rushes, 68 yards
- DAL – Tony Pollard – 12 rushes, 69 yards, 2 TD

**Top receivers**

- SF – Kendrick Bourne – 4 receptions, 86 yards, TD
- DAL – CeeDee Lamb – 5 receptions, 85 yards

The 49ers traveled to Dallas hoping to keep their season alive, but struggled throughout the game. The 49ers immediately trailed 17–7, and turned the ball over 4 times against one of the worst defenses in the NFL. Despite fighting back and forth after tying the game, the 49ers never had the lead. San Francisco also allowed Cowboys wide receiver CeeDee Lamb to return a kickoff for a touchdown, which sealed the 49ers' loss. This loss, combined with the Cardinals' victory over the Eagles, eliminated the 49ers from playoff contention. The 49ers also clinched a losing season for the 7th time in 10 years. As of 2025, this was the 49ers' most recent loss to the Cowboys.

==== Week 16: at Arizona Cardinals ====
Week Sixteen: San Francisco 49ers at Arizona Cardinals – Game summary

Quarter	1	2	3	4	Total
**49ers**	7	0	7	6	**20**
Cardinals	3	3	0	6	**12**

at State Farm Stadium, Glendale, Arizona

- Date: December 26
- Game time: 2:30 pm. MST/1:30 pm. PST
- Game weather: Mostly sunny, 69 °F (21 °C) (retractable roof open)
- Game attendance: 0
- Referee: Clete Blakeman
- TV announcers (Prime Video/Twitch): Andrew Catalon, James Lofton and Sherree Burruss
- Recap, Game Book

Game information

**First quarter**

- ARI – Mike Nugent 27-yard field goal, 10:10. Cardinals 3–0. **Drive: 11 plays, 74 yards, 4:50.**
- SF – Jeff Wilson 21-yard pass from C. J. Beathard (Robbie Gould kick), 2:44. 49ers 7–3. **Drive: 7 plays, 74 yards, 4:12.**

**Second quarter**

- ARI – Mike Nugent 43-yard field goal, 0:35. 49ers 7–6. **Drive: 10 plays, 34 yards, 2:35.**

**Third quarter**

- SF – Kyle Juszczyk 9-yard pass from C. J. Beathard (Robbie Gould kick), 5:13. 49ers 14–6. **Drive: 7 plays, 71 yards, 4:03.**

**Fourth quarter**

- ARI – Kenyan Drake 1-yard run (pass failed), 12:08. 49ers 14–12. **Drive: 14 plays, 87 yards, 6:55.**
- SF – Kyle Juszczyk 1-yard pass from C. J. Beathard (kick failed), 8:36. 49ers 20–12. **Drive: 2 plays, 35 yards, 0:24.**

**Top passers**

- SF – C. J. Beathard – 13/22, 182 yards, 3 TD
- ARI – Kyler Murray – 31/50, 247 yards, INT

**Top rushers**

- SF – Jeff Wilson – 22 rushes, 183 yards
- ARI – Kyler Murray – 8 rushes, 75 yards

**Top receivers**

- SF – George Kittle – 4 receptions, 92 yards
- ARI – Christian Kirk – 7 receptions, 76 yards

With this win, the San Francisco 49ers finished 5-3 in away games and brought their record up to 6-9 on the season.

==== Week 17: vs. Seattle Seahawks ====
Week Seventeen: Seattle Seahawks at San Francisco 49ers – Game summary

Quarter	1	2	3	4	Total
**Seahawks**	3	3	0	20	**26**
49ers	0	3	6	14	**23**

at State Farm Stadium, Glendale, Arizona

- Date: January 3, 2021
- Game time: 2:25 pm. MST/1:25 pm. PST
- Game weather: Partly cloudy, 62 °F (17 °C) (retractable roof open)
- Game attendance: 0
- Referee: Tony Corrente
- TV announcers (Fox): Kenny Albert and Jonathan Vilma
- Recap, Game Book

Game information

**First quarter**

- SEA – Jason Myers 36-yard field goal, 2:09. Seahawks 3–0. **Drive: 10 plays, 51 yards, 4:27.**

**Second quarter**

- SEA – Jason Myers 30-yard field goal, 9:27. Seahawks 6–0. **Drive: 12 plays, 58 yards, 6:03.**
- SF – Tristan Vizcaino 36-yard field goal, 0:25. Seahawks 6–3. **Drive: 10 plays, 61 yards, 6:11.**

**Third quarter**

- SF – Tristan Vizcaino 47-yard field goal, 9:31. Tied 6–6. **Drive: 10 plays, 53 yards, 5:29.**
- SF – Tristan Vizcaino 33-yard field goal, 6:19. 49ers 9–6. **Drive: 5 plays, 34 yards, 2:11.**

**Fourth quarter**

- SF – Jeff Wilson 7-yard run (Tristan Vizcaino kick), 14:22. 49ers 16–6. **Drive: 11 plays, 73 yards, 5:44.**
- SEA – Tyler Lockett 6-yard pass from Russell Wilson (kick failed), 10:54. 49ers 16–12. **Drive: 8 plays, 75 yards, 3:28.**
- SEA – Tyler Lockett 4-yard pass from Russell Wilson (Jason Myers kick), 2:20. Seahawks 19–16. **Drive: 14 plays, 85 yards, 5:26.**
- SEA – Alex Collins 8-yard run (Jason Myers kick), 1:49. Seahawks 26–16. **Drive: 3 plays, 17 yards, 0:21.**
- SF – Jeff Wilson 3-yard pass from C. J. Beathard (Tristan Vizcaino kick), 0:23. Seahawks 26–23. **Drive: 8 plays, 75 yards, 1:26.**

**Top passers**

- SEA – Russell Wilson – 20/36, 181 yards, 2 TD
- SF – C. J. Beathard – 25/37, 273 yards, TD

**Top rushers**

- SEA – Chris Carson – 11 rushes, 44 yards
- SF – Jeff Wilson – 20 rushes, 76 yards, TD

**Top receivers**

- SEA – Tyler Lockett – 12 receptions, 90 yards, 2 TD
- SF – Kendrick Bourne – 5 receptions, 76 yards

With this loss, the 49ers finished 1-7 at home and are 1-5 in their last 6 games against Seattle. The Defending NFC Champions would finish their season in dismissal 6-10 record and last place in the NFC West for the first time since 2017.

=== Standings ===
==== Division ====
NFC West
	W	L	T	PCT	DIV	CONF	PF	PA	STK
^{(3)} Seattle Seahawks	12	4	0	.750	4–2	9–3	459	371	W4
^{(6)} Los Angeles Rams	10	6	0	.625	3–3	9–3	372	296	W1
Arizona Cardinals	8	8	0	.500	2–4	6–6	410	367	L2
San Francisco 49ers	6	10	0	.375	3–3	4–8	376	390	L1

==== Conference ====
NFC
#	Team	Division	W	L	T	PCT	DIV	CONF	SOS	SOV	STK
**Division leaders**
1	Green Bay Packers	North	13	3	0	.813	5–1	10–2	.428	.387	W6
2 (Note: New Orleans finished ahead of Seattle based on conference record.)	New Orleans Saints	South	12	4	0	.750	6–0	10–2	.459	.406	W2
3	Seattle Seahawks	West	12	4	0	.750	4–2	9–3	.447	.404	W4
4	Washington Football Team	East	7	9	0	.438	4–2	5–7	.459	.388	W1
**Wild cards**
5	Tampa Bay Buccaneers	South	11	5	0	.688	4–2	8–4	.488	.392	W4
6	Los Angeles Rams	West	10	6	0	.625	3–3	9–3	.494	.484	W1
7 (Note: Chicago finished and clinched the 7th and final playoff spot ahead of Arizona based on better win percentage in common games (against Detroit, the NY Giants, Carolina, and the LA Rams, Chicago finished 3–2, while Arizona finished 1–4).)	Chicago Bears	North	8	8	0	.500	2–4	6–6	.488	.336	L1
**Did not qualify for the postseason**
8	Arizona Cardinals	West	8	8	0	.500	2–4	6–6	.475	.441	L2
9	Minnesota Vikings	North	7	9	0	.438	4–2	5–7	.504	.366	W1
10 (Note: San Francisco finished ahead of the NY Giants based on head-to-head victory. Division tie break was initially used to eliminate Dallas (see below).)	San Francisco 49ers	West	6	10	0	.375	3–3	4–8	.549	.448	L1
11 (Note: NY Giants won tiebreaker over Dallas based on division record.)	New York Giants	East	6	10	0	.375	4–2	5–7	.502	.427	W1
12	Dallas Cowboys	East	6	10	0	.375	2–4	5–7	.471	.333	L1
13 (Note: Carolina finished ahead of Detroit based on head-to-head victory.)	Carolina Panthers	South	5	11	0	.313	1–5	4–8	.531	.388	L1
14	Detroit Lions	North	5	11	0	.313	1–5	4–8	.508	.350	L4
15	Philadelphia Eagles	East	4	11	1	.281	2–4	4–8	.537	.469	L3
16	Atlanta Falcons	South	4	12	0	.250	1–5	2–10	.551	.391	L5
**Tiebreakers** (Note: When breaking ties for three or more teams under the NFL's rules, they are first broken within divisions, then comparing only the highest-ranked remaining team from each division.)
