= Jamar Taylor =

American football player (born 1990)

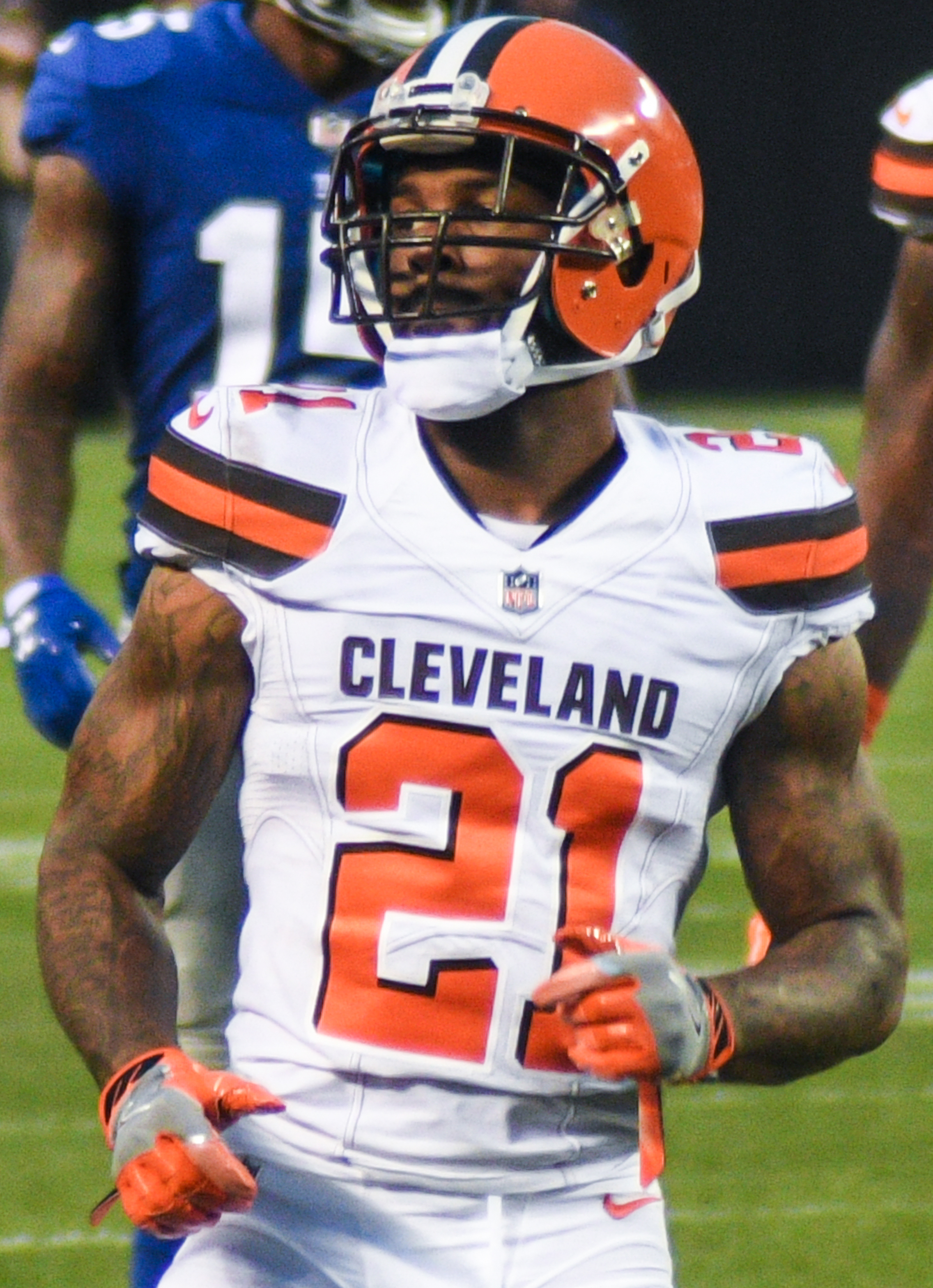
- Taylor with the Cleveland Browns in 2017

No. 22, 21, 28, 39, 24, 43, 47
- Position: Cornerback

Personal information
- Born: September 29, 1990 (age 36); San Diego, California, U.S.
- Listed height: 5 ft 11 in (1.80 m)
- Listed weight: 192 lb (87 kg)

Career information
- High school: Helix (La Mesa, California)
- College: Boise State (2008–2012)
- NFL draft: 2013: 2nd round, 54th overall pick

Career history
- Miami Dolphins (2013–2015); Cleveland Browns (2016–2017); Arizona Cardinals (2018); Denver Broncos (2018); Seattle Seahawks (2019); Atlanta Falcons (2019); San Francisco 49ers (2020)

Awards and highlights
- First-team All-MWC (2012)

Career NFL statistics
- Total tackles: 264
- Pass deflections: 34
- Interceptions: 5
- Forced fumbles: 2
- Fumble recoveries: 1
- Stats at Pro Football Reference

Jamar Andrew Taylor (born September 29, 1990) is an American former professional football player who was a cornerback in the National Football League (NFL). He played college football for the Boise State Broncos and was selected by the Miami Dolphins in the second round of the 2013 NFL draft.

== Early life ==
Taylor was born in San Diego, California. He attended Helix High School in La Mesa, California, and played high school football for the Helix Highlanders.

== College career ==
Taylor attended Boise State University, where he played for the Boise State Broncos football team from 2008 to 2012. During his college career, he had 132 tackles, seven interceptions and four sacks. As a senior in 2012, he was a first-team All-Mountain West Conference (MWC) selection.

Taylor was also a track and field athlete for Boise State, and recorded a personal best in the 100 meters of 10.72 seconds in 2012.

== Professional career ==
He received an invitation to the NFL combine and completed all of the required combine and positional drills. On March 21, 2013, he participated at Boise State's pro day and opted to perform only positional drills. At the conclusion of the pre-draft process, Taylor was projected to be a first or second-round pick by NFL draft experts and scouts. He was ranked the fourth best cornerback prospect in the draft by Sports Illustrated, the fifth best cornerback by DraftScout.com, and the sixth best cornerback by NFL analyst Mike Mayock.

External videos
- Jamar Taylor's NFL Combine Workout
- NFL Draft Profile: Jamar Taylor

Pre-draft measurables
Height	Weight	Arm length	Hand span	40-yard dash	10-yard split	20-yard split	20-yard shuttle	Three-cone drill	Vertical jump	Broad jump	Bench press
5 ft 10 5/8 in (1.79 m)	192 lb (87 kg)	30 3/4 in (0.78 m)	9 1/8 in (0.23 m)	4.39 s	1.53 s	2.57 s	4.06 s	6.82 s	35 in (0.89 m)	10 ft 7 in (3.23 m)	22 reps
All values from NFL Combine

=== Miami Dolphins ===
The Miami Dolphins selected Taylor in the second round (53rd overall) of the 2013 NFL draft. The pick used to draft him was acquired in a trade that sent Vontae Davis to the Indianapolis Colts. He was one of three defensive backs selected by the Dolphins in the 2013 NFL Draft, along with Will Davis (third round) and Don Jones (seventh round).

==== 2013 ====
On June 13, 2013, the Miami Dolphins signed him to a four-year, $3.62 million contract with $2 million guaranteed.

Taylor competed with Will Davis, Richard Marshall, and Nolan Carroll for the second cornerback job on the Dolphins' depth chart throughout training camp. Head coach Joe Philbin named him the Dolphins' sixth cornerback on the depth chart to begin the regular season, behind Brent Grimes, Nolan Carroll, Will Davis, R. J. Stanford, and Dimitri Patterson.

On September 30, 2013, he made his professional regular season debut during a 17–38 loss to the New Orleans Saints and made one tackle. He played in nine games his rookie year finishing with three total tackles.

==== 2014 ====
Throughout training camp, he competed against Cortland Finnegan for the role as the No. 2 starting cornerback following the departures of Nolan Carroll and Dimitri Patterson. He was named the Dolphins' third cornerback on their depth chart to begin the 2014 season behind Brent Grimes and Cortland Finnegan.

On November 13, 2014, Taylor earned his first career start after Cortland Finnegan was unable to play after sustaining an ankle injury the game prior. He finished the 22–9 win against the Buffalo Bills with a season-high seven solo tackles. The next game, he earned six solo tackles in a 36–39 loss to the Denver Broncos and suffered a dislocated shoulder during the game that sidelined him for the next three games. On December 23, 2014, he was placed on injured reserve. He finished the season with 31 combined tackles (30 solo) in 12 games and three starts.

==== 2015 ====
Taylor attended training camp in 2015 and competed with Will Davis, Brice McCain, Bobby McCain, and Zack Bowman for the second cornerback job left vacant by the retirement of Cortland Finnegan. He started the regular season behind Brent Grimes, Brice McCain, and Zack Bowman on the Dolphins' depth chart.

In the Miami Dolphins' season-opening 17–10 victory over the Washington Redskins and recorded a season-high nine combined tackles and made his first career pass deflection. On October 25, he earned his first start of the season after Brice McCain was sidelined with a knee injury he suffered the previous week. Taylor finished the 44–26 victory over the Houston Texans with seven combined tackles and a pass deflection. He started Weeks 7-12 and was a healthy scratch for four of the last five games of the season after struggling. Interim head coach Dan Campbell replaced Taylor on the active roster with Tony Lippett. He played in 12 games with six starts finishing the year with 48 tackles (35 solo), four pass deflections, and a fumble recovery.

=== Cleveland Browns ===
On April 30, 2016, Taylor was traded to the Cleveland Browns along with a seventh-round pick (250th overall) in the 2016 NFL draft for the Browns' seventh-round pick (223rd overall) in the same draft. The Dolphins used the selection to draft quarterback Brandon Doughty.

==== 2016 ====
Taylor entered the Cleveland Browns' training camp competing with Tramon Williams, K'Waun Williams, Pierre Desir, Briean Boddy-Calhoun, and Justin Gilbert for the second starting cornerback job. Head coach Hue Jackson named Taylor one of the Browns' starting cornerbacks to begin the regular season, alongside Joe Haden.

He started the Browns' 10–29 season-opening loss to the Philadelphia Eagles, finishing with five solo tackles. On September 25, 2016, Taylor recorded a solo tackle, defended a pass, and made the first interception of his career, intercepting Miami Dolphins' quarterback Ryan Tannehill in a 24-30 overtime loss. The following game, he collected a season-high seven combined tackles, deflected a pass, and intercepted a pass from Kirk Cousins in a 20–31 loss to the Washington Redskins. In Week 16, he made five combined tackles, deflected three passes, and intercepted Philip Rivers as the Browns earned their first win of the season during a 20–17 victory over the San Diego Chargers. Through his first 11 games and 10 starts as a Brown, Taylor has set career highs with three interceptions and eight passes defended. He finished his first season in Cleveland with 57 combined tackles (46 solo), career-high 13 pass deflections, and a career-high three interceptions in 14 starts and 15 games.

On December 10, 2016, the Cleveland Browns signed Taylor to a three-year, $16.5 million contract extension with $5.5 million guaranteed and a signing bonus of $3 million.

==== 2017 ====
The Cleveland Browns named Taylor their starting cornerback to begin the regular season, alongside Jason McCourty.

During a Week 2 loss to the Baltimore Ravens, he recorded a career-high nine combined tackles. On December 24, 2017, Taylor recorded a half-sack against the Chicago Bears, the first sack of his career. He finished the season playing in all 16 games, starting 15, recording a career-high 62 tackles along with 10 pass deflections.

=== Arizona Cardinals ===
External videos
- Cardinals trade Browns for Jamar Taylor

On May 18, 2018, Taylor was traded to the Arizona Cardinals for a sixth round draft pick in the 2020 NFL draft. The Cleveland Browns placed Taylor on the trade bloc after signing free agent cornerbacks T. J. Carrie and E. J. Gaines and drafting Denzel Ward on the first round of the 2018 NFL draft. He became the sixth Browns player traded by new Browns' general manager John Dorsey. He played in 10 games, starting three, before being released on November 19, 2018.

=== Denver Broncos ===
On December 4, 2018, Taylor signed with the Denver Broncos.

=== Seattle Seahawks ===
On May 9, 2019, Taylor signed with the Seattle Seahawks. He was released by Seattle on August 31. Taylor was re-signed by the Seahawks on September 10. On November 20, Taylor was waived by the Seahawks.

=== Atlanta Falcons ===
On December 10, 2019, Taylor was signed by the Atlanta Falcons.

=== San Francisco 49ers ===
Taylor signed with the San Francisco 49ers on July 6, 2020. He was released by San Francisco on September 3. Johnson was re-signed to the team'spractice squad on October 2. He was elevated to the active roster on October 3 for the team's Week 4 game against the Philadelphia Eagles. Johnson recorded his first career full sack on Carson Wentz in the game, and reverted to the practice squad the next day. He was promoted to the active roster on October 10. In Week 7 against the New England Patriots, Taylor intercepted two passes, one thrown by first string Cam Newton and one thrown by second string Jarrett Stidham, during the 33–6 win. This was the first time Taylor intercepted a pass since 2016. In a week 11 game against the Los Angeles Rams, Taylor suffered a torn ACL that would cause him to miss the remainder of the season. He was placed on injured reserve on December 1.

On October 18, 2022, the San Francisco 49ers hosted Taylor for a workout.

== NFL career statistics ==
Legend
**Bold**	Career high

Year	Team	Games		Tackles					Interceptions					Fumbles			
Year	Team	GP	GS	Cmb	Solo	Ast	Sck	TFL	Int	Yds	TD	Lng	PD	FF	FR	Yds	TD
2013	MIA	9	0	3	3	0	0.0	0	0	0	0	0	0	0	0	0	0
2014	MIA	12	3	31	30	1	0.0	**3**	0	0	0	0	0	0	0	0	0
2015	MIA	12	6	48	35	13	0.0	0	0	0	0	0	4	0	**1**	**31**	0
2016	CLE	15	14	57	46	11	0.0	0	**3**	**43**	0	**29**	**13**	0	0	0	0
2017	CLE	**16**	**15**	**62**	**48**	**14**	0.5	**3**	0	0	0	0	10	**1**	0	0	0
2018	ARI	10	3	17	15	2	0.0	0	0	0	0	0	1	0	0	0	0
2018	DEN	4	0	1	1	0	0.0	0	0	0	0	0	0	**1**	0	0	0
2019	SEA	9	0	22	18	4	0.0	0	0	0	0	0	3	0	0	0	0
2019	ATL	3	0	1	0	1	0.0	0	0	0	0	0	0	0	0	0	0
2020	SFO	8	3	22	20	2	**1.0**	2	2	8	0	8	3	0	0	0	0
		98	44	264	216	48	1.5	8	5	51	0	29	34	2	1	31	0
