= Dion Jordan =

American football player (born 1990)

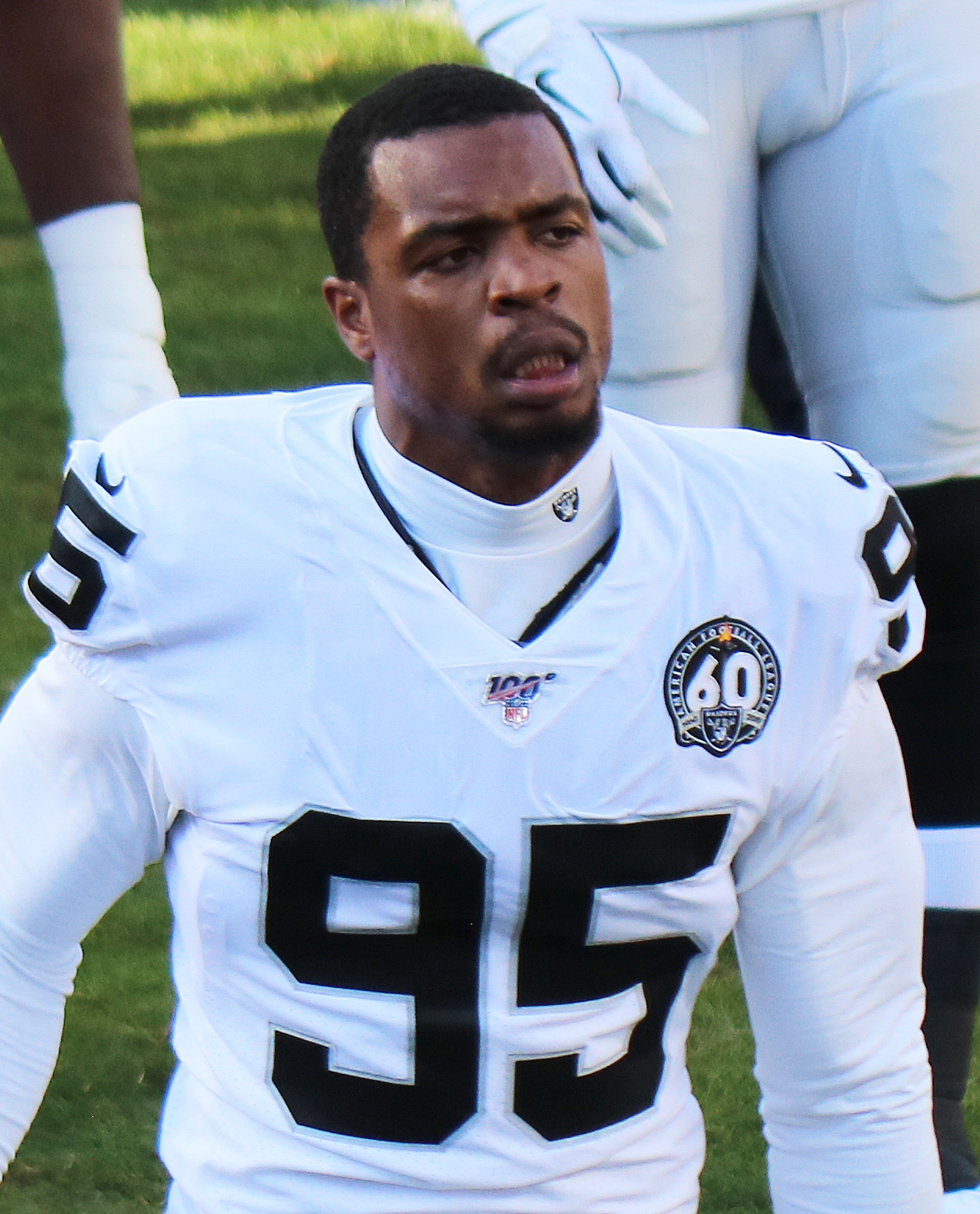
- Jordan with the Oakland Raiders in 2019

Eureka Red Devils
- Title: Head coach

Personal information
- Born: March 5, 1990 (age 36); San Francisco, California, U.S.
- Listed height: 6 ft 6 in (1.98 m)
- Listed weight: 248 lb (112 kg)

Career information
- Position: Defensive end (No. 95, 96)
- High school: Chandler (Chandler, Arizona)
- College: Oregon (2008–2012)
- NFL draft: 2013: 1st round, 3rd overall pick

Career history

Playing
- Miami Dolphins (2013–2016); Seattle Seahawks (2017–2018); Oakland Raiders (2019); San Francisco 49ers (2020)

Coaching
- Eureka (2025) Assistant head coach; Eureka (2026–present) Head coach

Awards and highlights
- First-team All-American (2012); 2× First-team All-Pac-12 (2011, 2012)

Career NFL statistics
- Total tackles: 108
- Sacks: 13.5
- Forced fumbles: 3
- Fumble recoveries: 1
- Pass deflections: 6
- Stats at Pro Football Reference

Head coaching record
- Regular season: 0-10
- Postseason: 0-2
- Career: 0–0 (–)

Dion Rory Jordan (born March 5, 1990) is an American college football coach and former professional player who was a defensive end in the National Football League (NFL). He is the head football coach for Eureka College, a position he has held since 2026. He played college football for the Oregon Ducks and was selected by the Miami Dolphins with the third pick of the 2013 NFL draft. He was also a member of the Seattle Seahawks, Oakland Raiders and San Francisco 49ers.

== Early life ==
Jordan attended Chandler High School in Chandler, Arizona. He played both tight end and defensive end. He caught 54 passes for 804 yards and 13 touchdowns as a junior. As a senior, he caught 13 passes for 292 yards and three touchdowns in six games before the remainder of his season was curtailed while recovering from a serious off-the-field accident. He was a four-star prospect, and was ranked as the 10th overall tight end in the country by Scout.com.

In track & field, Jordan was one of the state's top performers in the 110 and 300-meter hurdles. He recorded times of 14.24 seconds and 38.27 seconds in those events respectively. At the 2008 5A I Fiesta Region, he won the shot put (14.27 m) and placed fourth in the long jump (6.40 m).

== College career ==
Jordan attended the University of Oregon, where he played for the Oregon Ducks football team from 2008 to 2012. He redshirted in 2008. In 2010, he switched from tight end to defensive end. He finished the season with 33 tackles and two sacks. As a first-year starter in 2011, Jordan was a first-team All-Pac-12 Conference selection after recording 42 tackles, 13 tackles for loss, and 7.5 sacks. He was also named a first-team All-Pac-12 selection in 2012, after recording 44 tackles, 10.5 tackles for loss, and 5 sacks.

On February 23, 2013, Jordan announced that he would undergo surgery to repair a torn labrum. His recovery time required 3 to 4 months.

== Professional career ==
Pre-draft measurables
Height	Weight	Arm length	Hand span	40-yard dash	10-yard split	20-yard split	20-yard shuttle	Three-cone drill	Vertical jump	Broad jump
6 ft 6 1/4 in (1.99 m)	248 lb (112 kg)	33 7/8 in (0.86 m)	10 in (0.25 m)	4.60 s	1.61 s	2.59 s	4.35 s	7.02 s	32.5 in (0.83 m)	10 ft 2 in (3.10 m)
All values from NFL Combine

=== Miami Dolphins ===
Jordan was selected in the first round, third overall in the 2013 NFL draft by the Miami Dolphins, who traded up to acquire the pick from the Oakland Raiders. He became the highest selected Oregon Duck since Joey Harrington in 2002.

Jordan appeared in all 16 games in his rookie year of 2013 making 26 tackles, two sacks, and two passes defended.

On July 3, 2014, he was suspended for the first four games of the 2014 season for violating the NFL's performance-enhancing substance policy. On September 19, 2014, he again violated the drug policy and was given an additional two games to add for the suspension.

On April 28, 2015, Jordan was suspended for the entire 2015 season for violating the NFL's performance-enhancing substance policy for a third time. According to sources, he did not fail a drug test; however, it was determined that one of his test samples was diluted, which is considered a strike.

He was conditionally reinstated by the NFL on July 29, 2016, ending what was a 15-month suspension. The conditions stipulated in the reinstatement included that he would be able to return to the team for training camp, establishment of treatment resources for Jordan in Miami prior to his being allowed to play in any preseason games, a meeting with the NFL prior to being allowed to play in Week 1 of the regular season, and an in-season meeting with the NFL prior to a full reinstatement. Still, Jordan did not play a down at all during 2016. On March 31, 2017, he was released after failing a physical.

=== Seattle Seahawks ===
On April 11, 2017, Jordan was signed by the Seattle Seahawks. He was placed on the reserve/non-football injury list to start the season with a knee injury. On November 8, the Seahawks activated Jordan off reserves to the active roster. He played in five games of the season, finishing with 10 tackles and 4 sacks.

On March 14, 2018, the Seahawks placed a first-round restricted free agent tender on Jordan. On June 7, 2018 Jordan underwent minor knee surgery. On May 14, 2019, he was suspended for 10 games due to usage of Adderall. He admitted that he was taking it to alleviate his ADHD, but his therapeutic use exemption had expired and his appeal was declined.

=== Oakland Raiders ===
On November 9, 2019, Jordan signed with the Oakland Raiders. He was immediately placed on the reserve/suspended list to finish out his 10-game suspension. He was reinstated from suspension on November 12.

=== San Francisco 49ers ===
Jordan signed with the San Francisco 49ers on August 7, 2020. He was released during final roster cuts on September 5, 2020, and signed to the practice squad the next day. He was promoted to the active roster on September 23, 2020.

== Career statistics ==
=== NFL ===
Year	Team	Games		Defense			
Year	Team	GP	GS	Cmb	Solo	Ast	Sck
2013	MIA	16	0	26	19	7	2.0
2014	MIA	10	1	20	20	0	1.0
2015	MIA	Suspended - League substance abuse policy					
2016	MIA	DNP					
2017	SEA	5	0	18	10	8	4.0
2018	SEA	12	3	22	17	5	1.5
2019	OAK	7	0	5	5	0	2
2020	SF	13	1	17	11	6	3.0
Career		63	5	108	82	26	13.5

=== College ===
Year	Team	GP	Defense				
Year	Team	GP	Tackles	For loss	Sacks	Int	FF
2009	Oregon	6	2	0.0	0.0	0	0
2010	Oregon	13	33	5.5	2.0	0	0
2011	Oregon	14	42	13.0	7.5	0	1
2012	Oregon	12	44	10.5	5.0	0	3
Totals		45	121	29.0	14.5	0	4

== Head coaching record ==
Year	Team	Overall	Conference	Standing	Bowl/playoffs
Eureka Red Devils (Northern Athletics Collegiate Conference) (2026–present)
2026	Eureka	0–9	0–7		
Eureka:		0–0	0–0		
Total:		0–9			
