= Joe Walker (linebacker) =

American football player (born 1992)

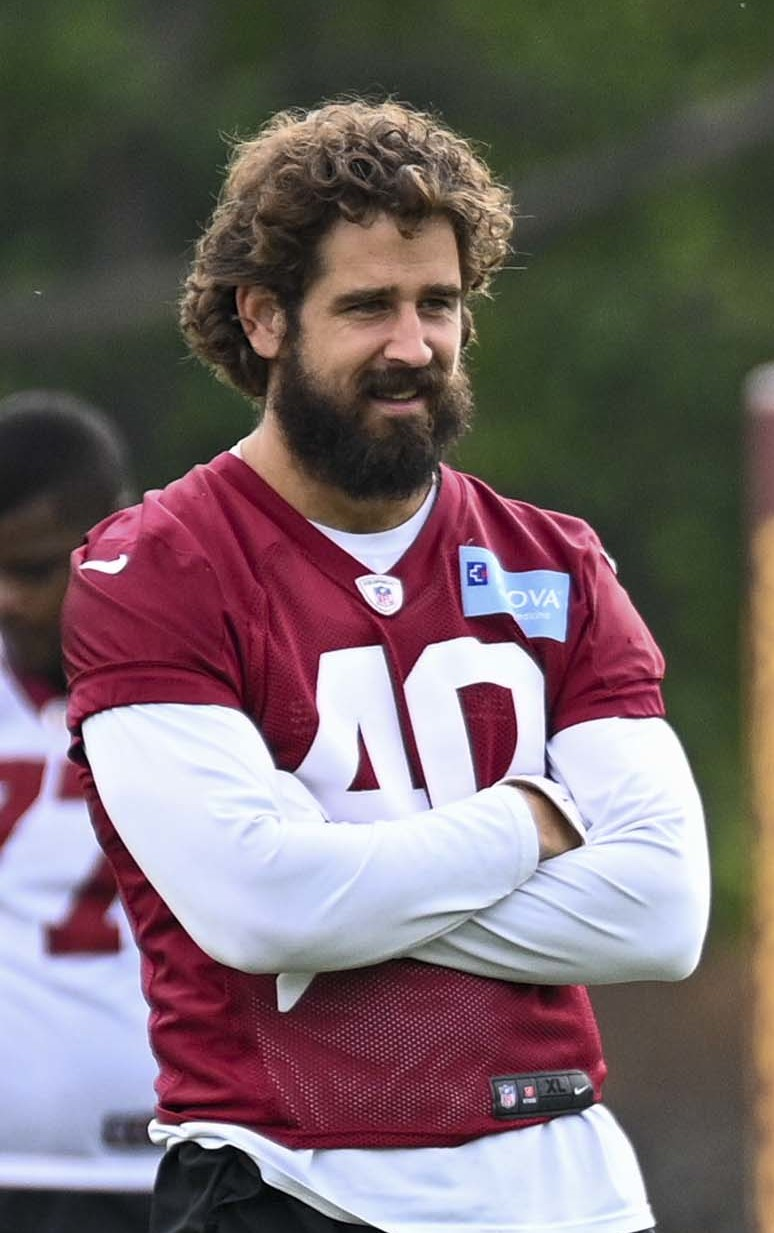
- Walker with the Washington Football Team in 2021

No. 59
- Position: Linebacker

Personal information
- Born: December 11, 1992 (age 33); Palos Verdes, California, U.S.
- Listed height: 6 ft 2 in (1.88 m)
- Listed weight: 236 lb (107 kg)

Career information
- High school: Palos Verdes
- College: Oregon (2012–2015)
- NFL draft: 2016: 7th round, 251st overall pick

Career history
- Philadelphia Eagles (2016–2018); Arizona Cardinals (2018–2019); San Francisco 49ers (2020); Washington Football Team (2021)*; Arizona Cardinals (2021)
- * Offseason or practice squad member only

Awards and highlights
- Super Bowl champion (LII)

Career NFL statistics
- Total tackles: 99
- Forced fumbles: 1
- Stats at Pro Football Reference

Joe Walker (born December 11, 1992) is an American former professional football player who was a linebacker in the National Football League (NFL). He played college football for the Oregon Ducks and was selected in the seventh round of the 2016 NFL draft by the Philadelphia Eagles. He was also a member of the Arizona Cardinals, San Francisco 49ers and Washington Football Team.

== College career ==
Walker led the Ducks in tackles in 2015, having started all but five games since the 2013 Alamo Bowl. He collected 203 career tackles in three seasons at Oregon, and 102 more during one season at junior college. He had many dynamic plays on the Ducks' fast-paced defense, including two fumbles recovered for touchdowns, one of which was the notorious drop at the 1-yard line by Utah wide receiver Kaelin Clay in the Utah-Oregon game on November 8, 2014, which Walker returned 99 yards for an Oregon touchdown.

== Professional career ==
=== Pre-draft ===
Walker was not one of the 39 collegiate linebackers invited to the 2016 NFL Scouting Combine, but competed in Oregon's Pro Day. Walker was a projected to be a seventh-round pick or priority undrafted free agent by NFL draft experts and scouts. He was ranked the 19th best inside linebacker prospect in the draft by NFLDraftScout.com.

Pre-draft measurables
Height	Weight	40-yard dash	10-yard split	20-yard split	20-yard shuttle	Three-cone drill	Vertical jump	Broad jump	Bench press
6 ft 2 in (1.88 m)	236 lb (107 kg)	4.60 s	1.63 s	2.65 s	4.39 s	6.86 s	37 in (0.94 m)	10 ft 4 in (3.15 m)	23 reps
All values from Oregon's Pro Day

=== Philadelphia Eagles ===
The Philadelphia Eagles selected Walker in the seventh round (251st overall) of the 2016 NFL draft. He was the 36th and last linebacker selected in 2016. The pick used to select him was a conditional pick that was traded from the Arizona Cardinals in exchange for Matt Barkley.

On May 4, 2016, Walker signed his four-year, rookie million contract. Throughout training camp, he competed against Najee Goode for a roster spot. On August 18, 2016, Walker tore his ACL in a preseason game against the Pittsburgh Steelers, effectively ending his rookie season. On August 28, 2016, Walker was placed on injured reserve.

He made his professional debut in the Philadelphia Eagles season-opening 30–17 win at the Washington Redskins. On September 24, 2017, Walker assisted on one tackle during the Eagles' 27–24 victory against the New York Giants. His first career tackle was with Jalen Mills as they teamed up to tackle Giants' wide receiver Sterling Shepard after he made a 10-yard reception in the first quarter. On October 29, 2017, Walker earned his first career start and made a season-high three combined tackles in a 33–10 win over the San Francisco 49ers. He was named the starting middle linebacker after Jordan Hicks suffered a torn Achilles and was placed on injured reserve for the remainder of the season. During a Week 12 matchup against the Chicago Bears, Walker suffered a neck injury and was placed on injured reserve on December 29, 2017. He finished the season with ten combined tackles (six solo) and a pass deflection in 12 games and three starts. The Eagles won Super Bowl LII against the New England Patriots by a score of 41–33.

On September 2, 2018, Walker was waived by the Eagles and was signed to the practice squad the next day.

=== Arizona Cardinals (first stint) ===
On September 19, 2018, Walker was signed by the Arizona Cardinals off the Eagles practice squad.

=== San Francisco 49ers ===
On March 24, 2020, Walker signed a one-year contract with the San Francisco 49ers. He was released on September 5, 2020, and signed to the practice squad the next day. He was elevated to the active roster on September 26 for the team's week 3 game against the New York Giants, and reverted to the practice squad after the game on September 28. He was elevated again on October 3 for the week 4 game against the Eagles, and reverted to the practice squad again after the game on October 5. He was signed to the active roster on October 21. He was placed on the team's reserve/COVID-19 list by the team on November 19, 2020, and activated on November 28.

=== Washington Football Team ===
Walker signed with the Washington Football Team on May 19, 2021. He was released on August 31, 2021.

=== Arizona Cardinals (second stint) ===
On October 13, 2021, Walker was signed to the Cardinals practice squad. He was promoted to the active roster on December 21. He was waived on January 11, 2022 and re-signed to the practice squad. He signed a reserve/future contract with the Cardinals on January 19, 2022.

On August 29, 2022, Walker was released by the Cardinals.
