= K'Waun Williams =

American football player (born 1991)

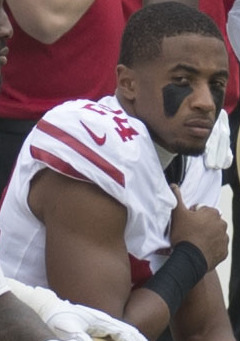
- Williams with the San Francisco 49ers in 2017

No. 36, 24, 21
- Position: Cornerback

Personal information
- Born: July 12, 1991 (age 35); Paterson, New Jersey, U.S.
- Listed height: 5 ft 9 in (1.75 m)
- Listed weight: 185 lb (84 kg)

Career information
- High school: Saint Joseph Regional (Montvale, New Jersey)
- College: Pittsburgh (2010–2013)
- NFL draft: 2014: undrafted

Career history
- Cleveland Browns (2014–2015); Chicago Bears (2016)*; San Francisco 49ers (2017–2021); Denver Broncos (2022–2023)
- * Offseason or practice squad member only

Career NFL statistics
- Total tackles: 345
- Sacks: 8
- Forced fumbles: 11
- Fumble recoveries: 3
- Pass deflections: 34
- Interceptions: 5
- Stats at Pro Football Reference

K'Waun Lamar Williams (/ˈkeɪwɔːn/ KAY-wawn; born July 12, 1991) is an American former professional football player who was a cornerback in the National Football League (NFL) from 2014 to 2023. He played college football for the Pittsburgh Panthers. He played in the NFL for the Cleveland Browns, San Francisco 49ers, and Denver Broncos.

== Early life ==
Williams played high school football for the Saint Joseph Regional High School Green Knights of Montvale, New Jersey. He played running back, wide receiver and cornerback. He was an All-New Jersey selection. Williams recorded 32 tackles, two interceptions, two fumble recoveries, four rushing touchdowns, and four receiving touchdowns his senior year. He is of Jamaican descent.

== College career ==
Williams played from 2010 to 2013 with the Pittsburgh Panthers.

== Professional career ==
=== Pre-draft ===
Williams was ranked as the 92nd best cornerback prospect in the 2014 NFL draft by DraftScout.com. He went undrafted, but received offers for a tryout from the Cleveland Browns and Pittsburgh Steelers. Williams declined the offer to attend the Steelers' rookie camp in order to reunite with Browns' defensive backs coach Jeff Hafley, who was also his position coach at Pitt and recruited him out of high school.

Pre-draft measurables
Height	Weight	Arm length	Hand span	40-yard dash	10-yard split	20-yard split	20-yard shuttle	Three-cone drill	Vertical jump	Broad jump	Bench press
5 ft 9 3/8 in (1.76 m)	183 lb (83 kg)	31 5/8 in (0.80 m)	9 3/4 in (0.25 m)	4.53 s	1.53 s	2.55 s	4.23 s	6.85 s	36 in (0.91 m)	10 ft 6 in (3.20 m)	8 reps
All values from Pittsburgh's Pro Day

=== Cleveland Browns ===
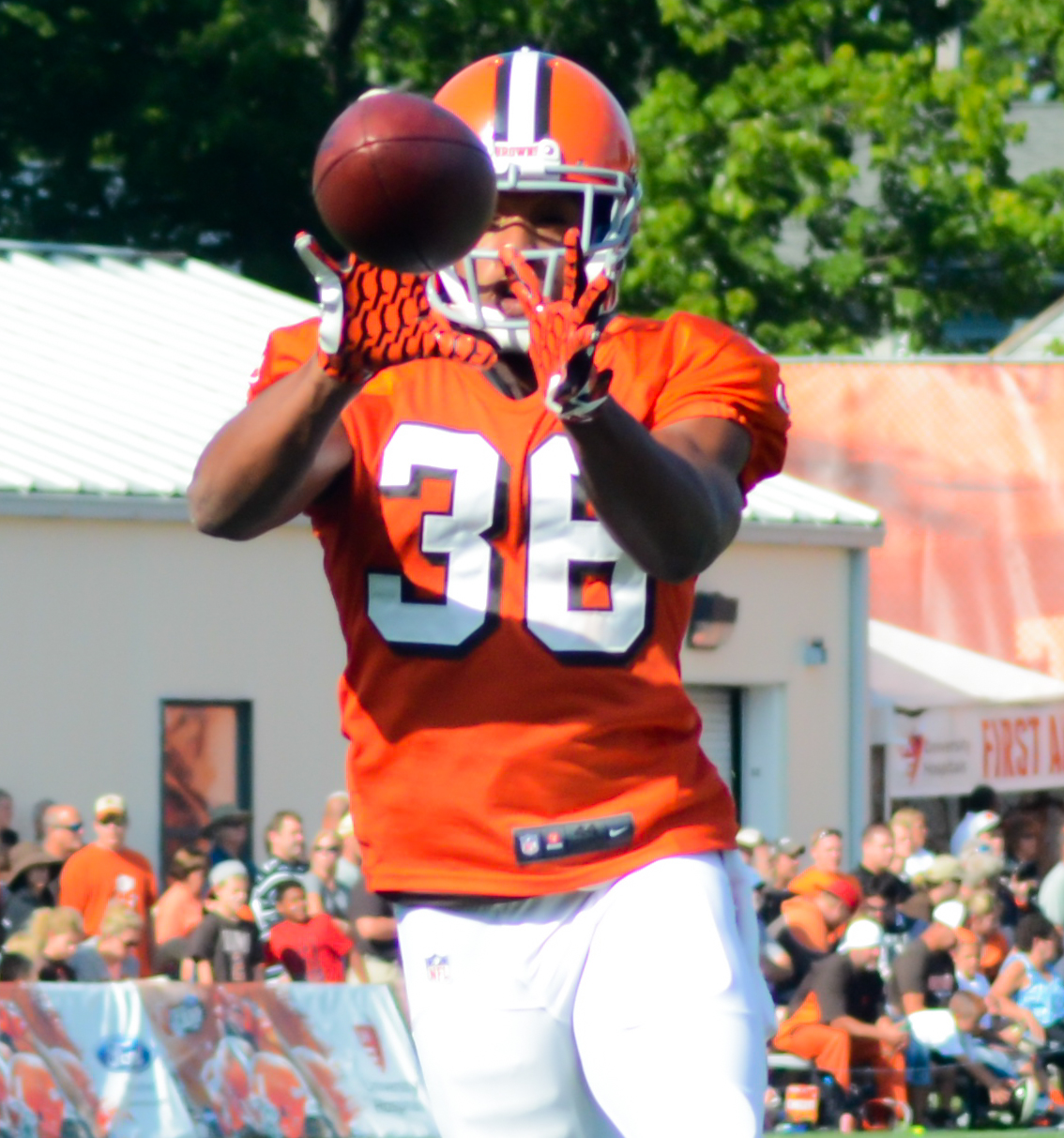
Williams with the Cleveland Browns in 2014

==== 2014 ====
On May 20, 2014, the Browns signed Williams to a two-year, $930,000 contract.

Throughout training camp, Williams competed for a roster spot as a backup cornerback and special teams contributor against Isaiah Trufant, Aaron Berry, Pierre Desir, Leon McFadden, T. J. Heath, Robert Nelson, and Royce Adams. He also competed to be the backup nickelback against Isaiah Trufant. Head coach Mike Pettine named Williams the seventh cornerback on the Browns' depth chart to start the regular season, behind Joe Haden, Buster Skrine, Justin Gilbert, Pierre Desir, Robert Nelson, and Aaron Berry. Williams was also named the backup nickelback behind Buster Skrine.

He made his professional regular season debut in the Browns' season-opener at the Steelers and made three combined tackles in their 30–27 loss. Williams was inserted at nickelback after rookie Justin Gilbert had issues in pass coverage and was replaced on the outside by nickelback Buster Skrine. He made his first career tackle on running back Le'Veon Bell after a nine-yard reception in the third quarter. On October 5, 2014, Williams collected a season-high six solo tackles, deflected a pass, and made his first career sack during a 29–28 victory at the Tennessee Titans in Week 5. Williams sacked backup quarterback Charlie Whitehurst for a six-yard loss in the third quarter. The following week, Williams earned his first career start, as a nickelback, and made a solo tackle and two pass deflections before exiting in the second quarter of the Browns' 31–10 win against the Steelers in Week 6 due to a concussion. He was inactive for the Browns' Week 7 loss at the Jacksonville Jaguars due to concussion symptoms. In Week 11, he collected a season-high eight combined tackles and a pass deflection during a 23–7 loss to the Houston Texans. Williams was inactive for two games (Weeks 15–16) due to a hamstring injury. He completed his rookie season in 2014 with 38 combined tackles (29 solo), eight pass deflections, and a sack in 13 games and four starts.

==== 2015 ====
Williams entered training camp slated as the first-team nickelback after Buster Skrine departed for the New York Jets in free agency. Pettine named Williams the third cornerback on the depth chart to start the season, behind Joe Haden and Tramon Williams. He was also officially named the first-team nickelback.

In Week 2, he made three solo tackles and sacked quarterback Marcus Mariota during a 28–14 victory against the Titans. He was sidelined for two games (Weeks 4–5) after sustaining a concussion. In Week 10, he collected a season-high five solo tackles in the Browns' 30–9 loss at the Steelers. Williams was inactive for the Browns' Week 15 loss at the Seattle Seahawks due to a shoulder injury. Williams finished the 2015 season with 39 combined tackles (31 solo), two pass breakups, three forced fumbles, two fumble recoveries, and a sack in 13 games and six starts.

==== 2016 ====
On August 12, 2016, Williams opted to not participate in the Browns' pre-season opener due to an ankle injury. On August 18, 2016, the Browns suspended Williams for two weeks and fined him for conduct detrimental to the team. The Browns argued the severity of Williams injury as he continued to sit out practice and received a second opinion. Williams received a second opinion from an independent specialist at the Cleveland Clinic and was told he would have to undergo surgery to remove bone spurs. Williams stated he planned to appeal the suspension and was also reportedly contemplating retirement. On August 29, 2016, the Browns waived Williams.

=== Chicago Bears ===
On August 30, 2016, the Chicago Bears claimed Williams off of waivers. However, the contract was voided after Williams failed a physical due to his ankle injury. On November 3, 2016, Williams underwent surgery to remove the bone spurs and was expected to recover within 12 weeks.

After being medically cleared following surgery, Williams received contract offers from multiple teams, including the Jets, Minnesota Vikings, Detroit Lions, and 49ers.

=== San Francisco 49ers ===
On February 21, 2017, the San Francisco 49ers signed Williams to a one-year, $615,000 contract with a signing bonus of $75,000. He reunited with 49ers' defensive backs coach Jeff Hafley, who was his position coach with the Cleveland Browns and at Pitt.

Throughout training camp, Williams competed against Will Redmond and Keith Reaser for the role as the first-team nickelback. Head coach Kyle Shanahan named Williams the first-team nickelback to start the regular season.

On September 29, 2017, the San Francisco 49ers signed Williams to a three-year, $8.85 million contract extension with $4.25 million guaranteed and a signing bonus of $3 million. On October 1, 2017, Williams collected a season-high eight combined tackles during an 18–15 loss at the Arizona Cardinals in Week 4. Williams was inactive for two games (Weeks 8–9) after injuring his quadriceps. On December 24, 2017, Williams recorded five combined tackles, deflected two passes, and made his first career interception during a 44–33 victory against the Jaguars in Week 16. He intercepted a pass by quarterback Blake Bortles and returned it for a 27-yard gain. He finished the 2017 season with a career-high 54 combined tackles (42 solo), five pass deflections, two forced fumbles, an interception, and a sack in 14 games and five starts. Pro Football Focus gave Williams an overall grade of 80.2, which ranked 44th among all qualifying cornerbacks in 2017.

On October 10, 2020, Williams was placed on injured reserve with a knee injury. He was activated on October 31. He was suspended two games by the NFL for violating the league's performance-enhancing drugs policy on November 24, 2020, but the suspension was rescinded the next day after testing issues were discovered.

On March 26, 2021, Williams re-signed with 49ers.

=== Denver Broncos ===
On March 23, 2022, Williams signed a two-year contract with the Denver Broncos. On November 14, it was announced that Williams would undergo arthroscopic surgery to clean out "loose bodies" scar tissue that had developed from a previous surgery; the fragments had been causing his knee to lock up, and the recovery timetable was set at four weeks.

On August 31, 2023, Williams was placed on injured reserve, and would go on to miss the entire 2023 season. During the following offseason, the Broncos opted not to re-sign him.

On January 14, 2025, Williams' agent announced his intention to retire from the NFL.

=== Statistics ===
Year	Team	GP	COMB	TOTAL	AST	SACK	FF	FR	FR YDS	INT	IR YDS	AVG IR	LNG	TD	PD
2014	CLE	13	38	29	9	1.0	0	0	0	0	0	0	0	0	8
2015	CLE	13	39	31	8	1.0	3	2	0	0	0	0	0	0	2
2017	SF	14	54	42	12	1.0	2	1	0	1	27	27	27	0	5
2018	SF	14	45	40	5	0.0	0	0	0	0	0	0	0	0	2
2019	SF	15	51	35	16	1.0	4	0	0	2	53	26.5	49	0	2
2020	SF	8	22	17	5	2.0	1	0	0	0	0	0	0	0	4
2021	SF	14	52	40	12	1.0	1	0	0	1	4	4.0	4	0	4
2022	DEN	14	44	30	14	1.0	0	0	0	1	0	0.0	0	0	7
Career		105	345	264	81	8.0	11	3	0	5	84	16.8	49	0	34
