= Alex Barrett =

American football player (born 1994)

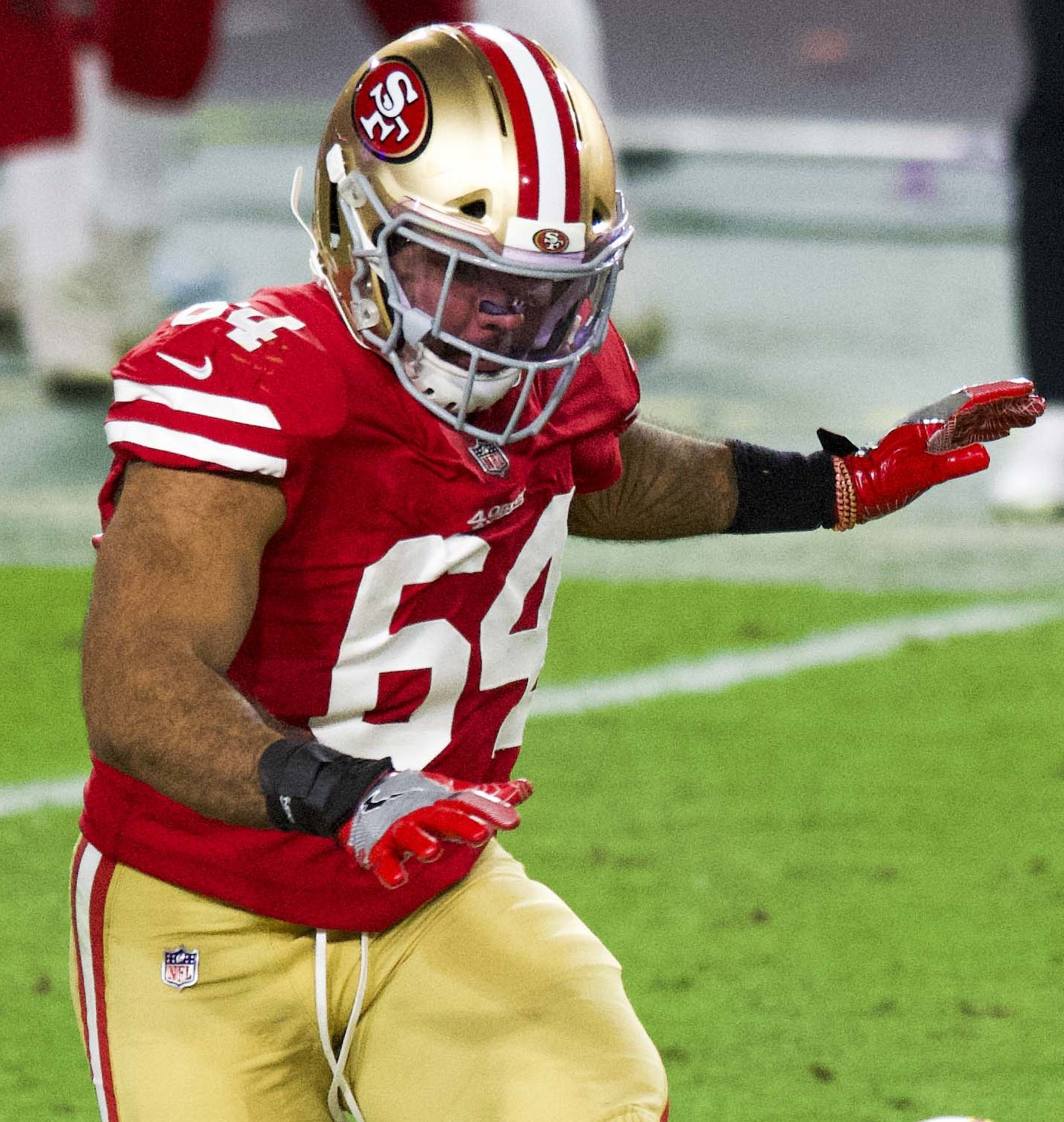
- Barrett with the 49ers in 2020

Profile
- Position: Defensive end

Personal information
- Born: March 6, 1994 (age 32); Yuma, Arizona, U.S.
- Listed height: 6 ft 2 in (1.88 m)
- Listed weight: 250 lb (113 kg)

Career information
- High school: Desert Ridge (Mesa, Arizona)
- College: San Diego State (2012–2016)
- NFL draft: 2017: undrafted

Career history
- Detroit Lions (2017–2018); San Diego Fleet (2019); Oakland Raiders (2019)*; San Francisco 49ers (2019–2024)
- * Offseason or practice squad member only

Awards and highlights
- 2× First-team All-Mountain West (2015, 2016)

Career NFL statistics
- Total tackles: 8
- Stats at Pro Football Reference

Alejandro Barrett (born March 6, 1994) is an American professional football defensive end. He played college football for the San Diego State Aztecs.

== Early life ==
Barrett was born on March 6, 1994, in Yuma, Arizona. He played high school football at Desert Ridge High School in Mesa, Arizona, and earned first-team all-state honors twice. He also lettered in track and field at Desert Ridge.

== College career ==
Barrett played for the San Diego State Aztecs of San Diego State University from 2013 to 2016. He was redshirted in 2012. He played in 12 games in 2013, recording 8 solo tackles, 7 tackle assists and 3 sacks. He played in 10 games, all starts, in 2014, recording 21 solo tackles, 18 tackle assists, 3 sacks, 3 pass breakups and 1 forced fumble. Barrett earned Honorable Mention All-Mountain West honors in 2014. He played in 14 games, all starts, in 2015, totaling 33 solo tackles, 29 tackle assists, 5.5 sacks, 2 interceptions, 1 pass breakup and 2 forced fumbles. He was named First-team All-Mountain West in 2015. Barrett played in 14 games, all starts, in 2016, recording 29 solo tackles, 24 tackle assists, 7.5 sacks and 4 pass breakups. He garnered First-team All-Mountain West recognition in 2016, becoming the first San Diego State defensive lineman to earn First-team All-Mountain West honors multiple times. He was also a team captain his senior year in 2016. Barrett played in 50 games, starting 38, during his college career, totaling 91 solo tackles, 78 tackle assists, 19 sacks, 2 interceptions, 8 pass breakups, and 3 forced fumbles. His 19 sacks were tied for the fourth most in school history.

== Professional career ==
=== Pre-draft ===
Barrett was rated the 43rd best defensive end in the 2017 NFL draft by NFLDraftScout.com.

Pre-draft measurables
Height	Weight	Arm length	Hand span	40-yard dash	10-yard split	20-yard split	20-yard shuttle	Three-cone drill	Vertical jump	Broad jump	Bench press
6 ft 1 5/8 in (1.87 m)	252 lb (114 kg)	32 in (0.81 m)	9 3/4 in (0.25 m)	4.97 s	1.68 s	2.85 s	4.42 s	7.41 s	30.0 in (0.76 m)	9 ft 1 in (2.77 m)	21 reps
All values from San Diego State Pro Day

=== Detroit Lions ===
Barrett signed with the Detroit Lions as an undrafted free agent on May 12, 2017. He was waived by the Lions on September 20 and signed to the team's practice squad on September 22. Barrett signed a reserve/future contract with the Lions on January 1, 2018.

On September 1, 2018, Barrett was waived by the Lions and was re-signed to the practice squad the next day. He was released by the Lions on September 19, following the signing of DeShawn Shead. Barrett was re-signed on October 31. He was released again on November 6.

=== San Diego Fleet ===
On November 9, 2018, Barrett signed with the San Diego Fleet of the Alliance of American Football (AAF) for the 2019 season. Prior to the league shutting down, Barrett recorded 15 tackles and 2 sacks in 8 games played.

=== Oakland Raiders ===
Barrett signed with the Oakland Raiders on April 5, 2019, three days after the AAF suspended football operations. He was waived/injured during final roster cuts on August 30. Barrett reverted to injured reserve after clearing waivers on September 1, but was released with an injury settlement on September 3.

=== San Francisco 49ers ===
On November 27, 2019, Barrett was signed to the San Francisco 49ers' practice squad. He re-signed with the 49ers on February 11, 2020. He was waived on July 30, but re-signed three days later. Barrett was waived again on August 13, but re-signed on August 30. He was waived again on September 5. On September 23, Barrett again was signed to the San Francisco 49ers' practice squad. He was promoted to the active roster on October 7. He was waived again on October 26, and was re-signed back to the practice squad two days later. Barrett was elevated to the active roster on November 28 for the team's Week 12 game against the Los Angeles Rams, and reverted to the practice squad after the game. He was signed back to the active roster on December 12. He was waived on December 14, and re-signed to the practice squad two days later. Barrett was elevated to the active roster again on December 25 for the team's Week 16 game against the Arizona Cardinals, and reverted to the practice squad again following the game. He was promoted to the active roster again on January 1, 2021.

On August 31, 2021, Barrett was waived by the 49ers and re-signed to the practice squad the next day. He signed a reserve/future contract with the 49ers on February 2, 2022.

On August 30, 2022, Barrett was waived by the 49ers and signed to the practice squad the next day. He signed a reserve/future contract with San Francisco on January 31, 2023.

On August 29, 2023, Barrett was waived by the 49ers and re-signed to the practice squad. He re-signed with the 49ers on February 14, 2024.

Barrett was released by the 49ers on August 27, 2024, and was subsequently re-signed to the practice squad. He was promoted to the team's active roster on January 4, 2025.

On April 22, 2025, Barrett re-signed with the 49ers. On May 19, Barrett was waived by the 49ers.
