= 2016 Cleveland Browns season =

68th season in franchise history

- Owner: Jimmy Haslam
- General manager: Sashi Brown
- Head coach: Hue Jackson
- Home stadium: FirstEnergy Stadium

Results
- Record: 1–15
- Division place: 4th AFC North
- Playoffs: Did not qualify
- Pro Bowlers: Joe Thomas, OT

Uniform
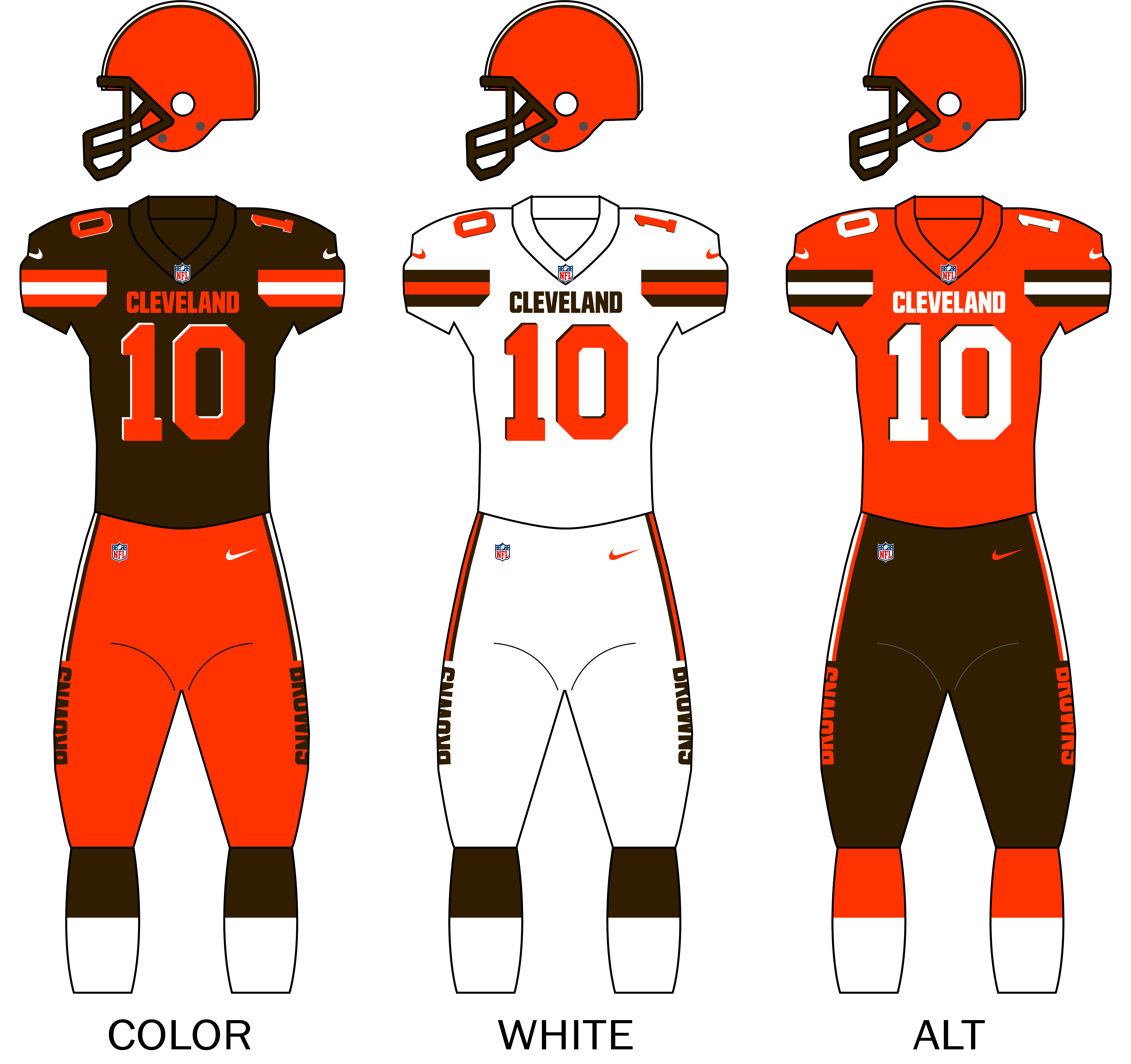

The 2016 season was the Cleveland Browns' 64th in the National Football League (NFL), their 68th overall and their first under head coach Hue Jackson and de facto general manager Sashi Brown. The Browns failed to improve upon their 3–13 record from their previous season, finishing 1–15, the worst record in franchise history, until it was immediately surpassed by the subsequent season's infamous 0–16 record. The Browns failed to make the playoffs for a franchise-record 14th straight season and ninth straight season with a losing record.

Despite the team's performance, offensive tackle Joe Thomas became the fifth player in league history to be selected to the Pro Bowl in each of his first 10 seasons.

== Offseason ==
=== Front office changes ===
On January 3, just hours after the Browns' final game of the 2015 season, the team fired general manager Ray Farmer, who had been the general manager the past two seasons. Team owner Jimmy Haslam also announced that the team's general counsel Sashi Brown would become the team's vice president of football operations.

On January 5, the Browns hired former New York Mets executive Paul DePodesta to be their chief strategy officer. DePodesta brought over 20 years of experience in the Major League Baseball front offices, but had never held an executive position in the NFL before this.

On March 4, the Browns announced the resignation of team president Alec Scheiner, effective March 31.

=== Coaching changes ===
On January 3, the Browns fired head coach Mike Pettine. In two seasons with the Browns, Pettine had a record of 10–22, but went just 4–19 after a 6–3 start to the 2014 season.

On January 13, the Browns hired former Cincinnati Bengals offensive coordinator Hue Jackson as head coach. Jackson was the Bengals' offensive coordinator for the past two seasons and was the head coach of the Oakland Raiders in 2011, in which they posted an 8–8 record.

=== Roster changes ===
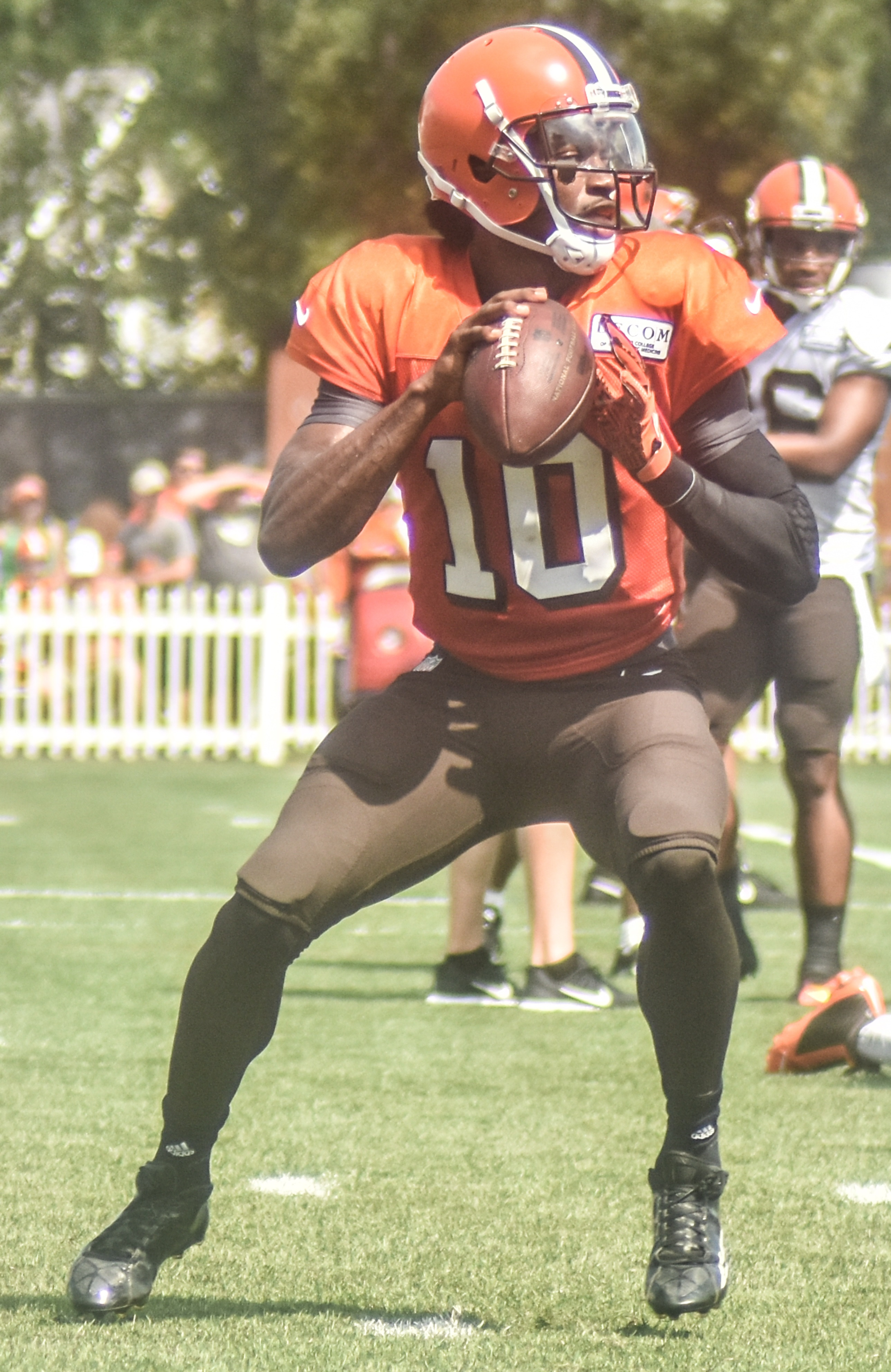
Robert Griffin III at Browns training camp

==== Free agents ====
Pos	Player	Tag	2016 Team	Signed
SS	Johnson Bademosi	UFA	Detroit Lions	March 10
WR	Travis Benjamin	UFA	San Diego Chargers	March 9
ILB	Tank Carder	UFA	Cleveland Browns	March 7
K	Travis Coons	ERFA	Cleveland Browns	April 4
QB	Pat Devlin	RFA		
FS	Tashaun Gipson	UFA	Jacksonville Jaguars	March 9
WR	Darius Jennings	ERFA	Cleveland Browns	April 6
OLB	Cam Johnson	ERFA	Cleveland Browns	
FS	Don Jones	UFA	Cleveland Browns	March 17
C	Alex Mack	UFA	Atlanta Falcons	March 9
DE	Jamie Meder	ERFA	Cleveland Browns	March 7
T	Darrian Miller	ERFA		
RB	Raheem Mostert	ERFA	Cleveland Browns	March 7
G	Austin Pasztor	RFA	Cleveland Browns	April 4
WR	Terrelle Pryor	UFA	Cleveland Browns	March 17
LB	Craig Robertson	UFA	New Orleans Saints	March 22
T	Mitchell Schwartz	UFA	Kansas City Chiefs	March 9
ILB	Scott Solomon	RFA		

==== Releases ====
Pos	Player	Released	2016 Team	Signed
WR	Dwayne Bowe	March 16		
LB	Karlos Dansby	March 16	Cincinnati Bengals	March 29
QB	Johnny Manziel	March 11		
SS	Donte Whitner	April 2	Washington Redskins	October 5
WR	Brian Hartline	May 23		

==== Signings ====
Pos	Player	2015 Team	Signed
G	Alvin Bailey	Seattle Seahawks	March 11
LB	Demario Davis	New York Jets	March 16
QB	Robert Griffin III	Washington Redskins	March 24
S	Rahim Moore	Houston Texans	March 16
LB	Justin Tuggle	Houston Texans	March 11

=== Draft ===
2016 Cleveland Browns draft
Round	Selection	Player	Position	College
1	15	Corey Coleman	WR	Baylor
2	32	Emmanuel Ogbah	DE	Oklahoma State
3	65	Carl Nassib	DE	Penn State
3	76	Shon Coleman	T	Auburn
3	93	Cody Kessler	QB	USC
4	99	Joe Schobert	OLB	Wisconsin
4	114	Ricardo Louis	WR	Auburn
4	129	Derrick Kindred	FS	TCU
4	138^	Seth DeValve	TE	Princeton
5	154	Jordan Payton	WR	UCLA
5	168	Spencer Drango	T	Baylor
5	172^	Rashard Higgins	WR	Colorado State
5	173^	Trey Caldwell	CB	Louisiana–Monroe
7	250	Scooby Wright III	ILB	Arizona

Notes

- The Browns traded their original 1st round selection (No. 2) to the Philadelphia Eagles for the Eagles' 1st (8), 3rd (77), and 4th (100) round selections, as well as the Eagles' 1st round selection in 2017 and 2nd round selection in 2018.

- The Browns would then trade the No. 8 and its 6th round (176) selection to the Tennessee Titans for their 1st (15) and 3rd (76) round selections and a 2nd round selection in 2017.

- The Browns traded their 3rd (No. 77) and 5th (141) round selections to the Carolina Panthers for their 3rd (93), 4th (129), and 5th (168) round selections.
- The Browns traded their 4th round selection (No. 100) to the Oakland Raiders for their 4th (114) and 5th (154) round selections.
- The Browns traded their 7th round selection (No. 223) to the Miami Dolphins for their 7th round selection (250) and CB Jamar Taylor.
- ^As the result of a negative differential of free agent signings and departures that the Browns experienced during the 2015 free agency period, the team received three compensatory selections for the 2016 draft: selection 138 in the fourth round, and selections 172 and 173 in the fifth round. Free agent transactions that occurred after May 12, 2015, did not impact the team's formula for determining compensatory selections for the 2016 draft.

== Josh Gordon's reinstatement and rehab ==
On April 1, wide receiver Josh Gordon applied for reinstatement following an indefinite suspension by the NFL due to repeated violations of the league's substance abuse policy, causing him to miss the entire 2015 season. On April 11, it was revealed that Gordon had failed another drug test, and on April 12, the league announced that Gordon's appeal had been denied. He was eligible to reapply on August 1.

On July 25, the NFL announced that Gordon would be reinstated on a conditional basis, and can stay with the team during a four-game ban to begin the season.

== Staff ==
2016 Cleveland Browns staff
Front office: Owners – Jimmy and Dee Haslam; Chief strategy officer – Paul DePodesta; Executive vice president of football operations – Sashi Brown; Vice president, player personnel – Andrew Berry; Vice president, player personnel – Ken Kovash; Vice president, football operations – Phil Dangerfield; Director of football administration – Chris Cooper; Director of research & strategy – Kevin Meers; Director of player personnel – Chisolm Opara; Director of college scouting – Bobby Vega; Director of pro scouting – Dan Saganey; Director of scouting – Mike Cetta; Assistant director of scouting – Glenn Cook; Special advisor – Jim Brown; Head coaches: Head coach – Hue Jackson; Offensive coaches: Associate head coach-offense – Pep Hamilton; Run game coordinator/running backs – Kirby Wilson; Senior offensive assistant/wide receivers – Al Saunders; Tight ends – Greg Seamon; Offensive line – Hal Hunter; Assistant offensive line – Mark Hutson; Offensive quality control/assistant running backs – Rock Cartwright; Offensive quality control/assistant wide receivers – Bob Saunders	Defensive coaches: Defensive coordinator – Ray Horton; Defensive line – Robert Nunn; Assistant defensive line – Ken Delgado; Outside linebackers – Ryan Slowik; Inside linebackers – Johnny Holland; Defensive backs – Louie Cioffi; Assistant defensive backs – Cannon Matthews; Defensive quality control – Eric Sanders; Special teams coaches: Special teams coordinator – Chris Tabor; Special teams assistant – Shawn Mennenga; Special teams quality control – Stan Watson; Strength and conditioning: Director, high performance – Adam Beard; Strength and conditioning coordinator – Evan Marcus; Strength and conditioning coordinator – Jason Veltkamp; Assistant strength/skill development – Joe Kim; Assistant strength and conditioning – Derik Keyes; Assistant strength and conditioning – Art Tolhurst; Sports scientist – Jamey Mroz; Strength and conditioning intern – Ian Jones

== Final roster ==
2016 Cleveland Browns roster
Quarterbacks (QB): 10 Robert Griffin III; 8 Kevin Hogan; 6 Cody Kessler; 13 Josh McCown; Running backs (RB): 25 George Atkinson III; 34 Isaiah Crowell; 35 Darius Jackson; 29 Duke Johnson; 40 Danny Vitale FB; Wide receivers (WR): 15 Mario Alford; 19 Corey Coleman; 16 Andrew Hawkins; 81 Rashard Higgins; 80 Ricardo Louis; 11 Terrelle Pryor; Tight ends (TE): 82 Gary Barnidge; 87 Seth DeValve; 86 Randall Telfer	Offensive linemen (OL): 78 Alvin Bailey G; 72 Shon Coleman T; 66 Spencer Drango G; 74 Cameron Erving C; 61 Anthony Fabiano C; 60 Gabe Ikard C; 67 Austin Pasztor T; 73 Joe Thomas T; Defensive linemen (DL): 96 Xavier Cooper DE; 98 Jamie Meder DE; 94 Carl Nassib DE; 99 Stephen Paea DE; 71 Danny Shelton NT; 97 Gabe Wright NT	Linebackers (LB): 54 Dominique Alexander ILB; 59 Tank Carder ILB; 51 Jamie Collins OLB; 56 Demario Davis ILB; 91 Tyrone Holmes OLB; 57 Cam Johnson OLB; 58 Christian Kirksey ILB; 90 Emmanuel Ogbah OLB; 53 Joe Schobert OLB; Defensive backs (DB): 20 Briean Boddy-Calhoun CB; 26 Marcus Burley CB; 31 Trey Caldwell CB; 24 Ibraheim Campbell SS; 23 Joe Haden CB; 41 Tracy Howard FS; 39 Ed Reynolds FS; 21 Jamar Taylor CB; 22 Tramon Williams; Special teams (ST): 4 Britton Colquitt P; 47 Charley Hughlett LS; 3 Cody Parkey K	Practice squad: 83 Josh Boyce WR; 52 James Burgess OLB; 93 Trevon Coley NT; 36 Justin Currie SS; 37 Trae Elston FS; 89 Connor Hamlett TE; 28 Darius Hillary CB; 49 J. P. Holtz TE; 17 Jordan Leslie WR; 79 Zach Sterup T; Reserve: 75 Joel Bitonio G (IR); 92 Desmond Bryant DE (NF-Inj.); 12 Josh Gordon WR (Susp.); 77 John Greco G (IR); 85 Rannell Hall WR (IR); 30 Derrick Kindred SS (NF-Inj.); 70 Nile Lawrence-Stample NT (IR); 43 Rajion Neal RB (IR); 44 Nate Orchard OLB (IR); 83 Dennis Parks WR (IR); 84 Jordan Payton WR (Susp.); 33 Jordan Poyer FS (IR); 62 Austin Reiter C (IR); 28 Glenn Winston RB (IR); 97 Dylan Wynn DE (IR); Rookies in italics 53 active, 15 reserve, 10 practice squad

== Preseason ==
=== Schedule ===
Week	Date	Opponent	Result	Record	Venue	Recap
1	August 12	at Green Bay Packers	L 11–17	0–1	Lambeau Field	Recap
2	August 18	Atlanta Falcons	L 13–24	0–2	FirstEnergy Stadium	Recap
3	August 26	at Tampa Bay Buccaneers	L 13–30	0–3	Raymond James Stadium	Recap
4	September 1	Chicago Bears	L 7–21	0–4	FirstEnergy Stadium	Recap

== Regular season ==
=== Schedule ===
Week	Date	Opponent	Result	Record	Venue	Recap
1	September 11	at Philadelphia Eagles	**L** 10–29	0–1	Lincoln Financial Field	Recap
2	September 18	**Baltimore Ravens**	**L** 20–25	0–2	FirstEnergy Stadium	Recap
3	September 25	at Miami Dolphins	**L** 24–30 (OT)	0–3	Hard Rock Stadium	Recap
4	October 2	at Washington Redskins	**L** 20–31	0–4	FedExField	Recap
5	October 9	New England Patriots	**L** 13–33	0–5	FirstEnergy Stadium	Recap
6	October 16	at Tennessee Titans	**L** 26–28	0–6	Nissan Stadium	Recap
7	October 23	at **Cincinnati Bengals**	**L** 17–31	0–7	Paul Brown Stadium	Recap
8	October 30	New York Jets	**L** 28–31	0–8	FirstEnergy Stadium	Recap
9	November 6	Dallas Cowboys	**L** 10–35	0–9	FirstEnergy Stadium	Recap
10	November 10	at **Baltimore Ravens**	**L** 7–28	0–10	M&T Bank Stadium	Recap
11	November 20	**Pittsburgh Steelers**	**L** 9–24	0–11	FirstEnergy Stadium	Recap
12	November 27	New York Giants	**L** 13–27	0–12	FirstEnergy Stadium	Recap
13	Bye					
14	December 11	**Cincinnati Bengals**	**L** 10–23	0–13	FirstEnergy Stadium	Recap
15	December 18	at Buffalo Bills	**L** 13–33	0–14	New Era Field	Recap
16	December 24	San Diego Chargers	**W** 20–17	1–14	FirstEnergy Stadium	Recap
17	January 1	at **Pittsburgh Steelers**	**L** 24–27 (OT)	1–15	Heinz Field	Recap

Note: Intra-division opponents are in bold text.

=== Game summaries ===
==== Week 1: at Philadelphia Eagles ====
Week One: Cleveland Browns at Philadelphia Eagles – Game summary

Quarter	1	2	3	4	Total
Browns	0	7	3	0	**10**
**Eagles**	7	6	9	7	**29**

at Lincoln Financial Field, Philadelphia, Pennsylvania

- Date: September 11
- Game time: 1:00 p.m. EDT
- Game weather: 85 °F (29 °C), sunny
- Game attendance: 69,596
- Referee: Walt Anderson
- TV announcers (CBS): Greg Gumbel, Trent Green and Jamie Erdahl
- Recap, Gamebook

Game information

**First quarter**

- PHI – Jordan Matthews 19-yard pass from Carson Wentz (Caleb Sturgis kick), 9:50. Eagles 7–0. **Drive: 9 plays, 75 yards, 5:10.**

**Second quarter**

- PHI – Caleb Sturgis 22-yard field goal, 12:30. Eagles 10–0. **Drive: 5 plays, 31 yards, 2:14.**
- CLE – Isaiah Crowell 2-yard run (Patrick Murray kick), 9:11. Eagles 10–7. **Drive: 7 plays, 75 yards, 3:19.**
- PHI – Caleb Sturgis 38-yard field goal, 0:27. Eagles 13–7. **Drive: 11 plays, 60 yards, 3:16.**

**Third quarter**

- CLE – Patrick Murray 35-yard field goal, 13:57. Eagles 13–10. **Drive: 5 plays, 58 yards, 1:03.**
- PHI – Cameron Erving fumble out of bounds in end zone for a safety, 10:49. Eagles 15–10.
- PHI – Nelson Agholor 35-yard pass from Carson Wentz (Caleb Sturgis kick), 6:17. Eagles 22–10. **Drive: 9 plays, 73 yards, 4:32.**

**Fourth quarter**

- PHI – Ryan Mathews 1-yard run (Caleb Sturgis kick), 1:12. Eagles 29–10. **Drive: 5 plays, 15 yards, 2:24.**

**Top passers**

- CLE – Robert Griffin III – 12/26, 190 yards, INT
- PHI – Carson Wentz – 22/37, 278 yards, 2 TD

**Top rushers**

- CLE – Isaiah Crowell – 12 rushes, 62 yards, TD
- PHI – Ryan Mathews – 22 rushes, 77 yards, TD

**Top receivers**

- CLE – Corey Coleman – 2 receptions, 69 yards
- PHI – Jordan Matthews – 7 receptions, 114 yards, TD

The Browns opened their 2016 regular season with a road game against the Philadelphia Eagles and rookie quarterback Carson Wentz, whom the Browns had passed up in the 2016 draft. The Eagles won 29–10 and with the loss, the Browns started the season 0–1. This would be their 12th straight regular season opening loss.

==== Week 2: vs. Baltimore Ravens ====
Week Two: Baltimore Ravens at Cleveland Browns – Game summary

Quarter	1	2	3	4	Total
**Ravens**	2	10	7	6	**25**
Browns	20	0	0	0	**20**

at FirstEnergy Stadium, Cleveland, Ohio

- Date: September 18
- Game time: 1:00 pm. EDT
- Game weather: 74 °F (23 °C), sunny
- Game attendance: 67,431
- Referee: John Hussey
- TV announcers (CBS): Carter Blackburn and Chris Simms
- Recap, Gamebook

Game information

**First quarter**

- CLE – Corey Coleman 31-yard pass from Josh McCown (Patrick Murray kick), 9:45. Browns 7–0. **Drive: 9 plays, 75 yards, 5:15.**
- CLE – Isaiah Crowell 85-yard run (Patrick Murray kick), 6:47. Browns 14–0. **Drive: 1 play, 85 yards, 0:11.**
- CLE – Corey Coleman 11-yard pass from Josh McCown, 4:34. Browns 20–0. **Drive: 4 plays, 27 yards, 1:25.**
- BAL – Tavon Young defensive two-point conversion, 4:34. Browns 20–2.

**Second quarter**

- BAL – Mike Wallace 7-yard pass from Joe Flacco (Justin Tucker kick), 1:15. Browns 20–9. **Drive: 6 plays, 75 yards, 1:59.**
- BAL – Justin Tucker 52-yard field goal, 0:00. Browns 20–12. **Drive: 7 plays, 27 yards, 0:42.**

**Third quarter**

- BAL – Mike Wallace 17-yard pass from Joe Flacco (Justin Tucker kick), 12:17. Browns 20–19. **Drive: 6 plays, 75 yards, 2:43.**

**Fourth quarter**

- BAL – Justin Tucker 49-yard field goal, 11:19. Ravens 22–20. **Drive: 5 plays, 27 yards, 2:35.**
- BAL – Justin Tucker 41-yard field goal, 2:53. Ravens 25–20. **Drive: 11 plays, 41 yards, 5:08.**

**Top passers**

- BAL – Joe Flacco – 24/45, 302 yards, 2 TD, 2 INT
- CLE – Josh McCown – 20/33, 260 yards, 2 TD, 2 INT

**Top rushers**

- BAL – Terrance West – 11 rushes, 42 yards
- CLE – Isaiah Crowell – 18 rushes, 133 yards, TD

**Top receivers**

- BAL – Dennis Pitta – 9 receptions, 102 yards
- CLE – Corey Coleman – 5 receptions, 104 yards, 2 TD

The Browns scored on their first three drives and led 20–2 early in the first quarter. The 18-point lead at the end of the first quarter was the Browns' largest lead after the 1st quarter since 1960. However, the Browns' offense stalled the rest of the game. The Ravens would score the final 23 points of the game to win 25–20. The Browns had a chance to score a go-ahead touchdown on a drive with less than a minute to play, but things went wrong after a controversial taunting penalty was called on Pryor following his catch at the Ravens' 10-yard line with under 30 seconds to play. McCown would throw an interception on the next play to seal the loss.

With the loss, the Browns fell to 0–2.

==== Week 3: at Miami Dolphins ====
Week Three: Cleveland Browns at Miami Dolphins – Game summary

Quarter	1	2	3	4	OT	Total
Browns	0	13	0	11	0	**24**
**Dolphins**	7	3	7	7	6	**30**

at Hard Rock Stadium, Miami Gardens, Florida

- Date: September 25
- Game time: 1:00 pm. EDT
- Game weather: 85 °F (29 °C), partly cloudy
- Referee: Clete Blakeman
- TV announcers (CBS): Spero Dedes and Solomon Wilcots
- Recap, Gamebook

Game information

**First quarter**

- MIA – DeVante Parker 26-yard pass from Ryan Tannehill (Andrew Franks kick), 10:16. Dolphins 7–0. **Drive: 5 plays, 61 yards, 2:37.**

**Second quarter**

- CLE – Cody Parkey 46-yard field goal, 13:32. Dolphins 7–3. **Drive: 10 plays, 58 yards, 5:03.**
- CLE – Briean Boddy-Calhoun 27-yard interception return (Cody Parkey kick), 6:47. Browns 10–7.
- MIA – Andrew Franks 37-yard field goal, 1:57. Tied 10–10. **Drive: 10 plays, 56 yards, 4:50.**
- CLE – Cody Parkey 48-yard field goal, 0:42. Browns 13–10. **Drive: 8 plays, 45 yards, 1:15.**

**Third quarter**

- MIA – Jarvis Landry 42-yard pass from Ryan Tannehill (Andrew Franks kick), 5:17. Dolphins 17–13. **Drive: 4 plays, 68 yards, 2:10.**

**Fourth quarter**

- MIA – Damien Williams 10-yard pass from Ryan Tannehill (Andrew Franks kick), 14:17. Dolphins 24–13. **Drive: 6 plays, 64 yards, 3:16.**
- CLE – Terrelle Pryor 3-yard run (Cody Kessler–Gary Barnidge pass), 10:12. Dolphins 24–21. **Drive: 9 plays, 83 yards, 4:05.**
- CLE – Cody Parkey 38-yard field goal, 3:14. Tied 24–24. **Drive: 8 plays, 74 yards, 3:03.**

**Overtime**

- MIA – Jay Ajayi 11-yard run, 8:26. Dolphins 30–24. **Drive: 3 plays, 44 yards, 1:13.**

**Top passers**

- CLE – Cody Kessler – 21/33, 244 yards
- MIA – Ryan Tannehill – 25/39, 319 yards, 3 TD, 2 INT

**Top rushers**

- CLE – Isaiah Crowell – 15 rushes, 79 yards
- MIA – Kenyan Drake – 9 rushes, 37 yards

**Top receivers**

- CLE – Terrelle Pryor – 8 receptions, 144 yards
- MIA – Jarvis Landry – 7 receptions, 120 yards, TD

Cody Kessler made his debut as the Browns' starting quarterback. The Browns led 13–10 at halftime. However, the Dolphins scored two consecutive touchdowns to go up 24–13 early in the fourth quarter. The Browns, sparked by Pryor, rallied to tie the game. The Dolphins attempted a game-winning drive in the final minute of regulation. However, Dolphins QB, Ryan Tannehill, fumbled the ball, and the Browns secured possession. The Browns had a chance to win it at the end of regulation. However, recently signed Browns kicker, Cody Parkey, missed the 46-yard field goal, sending the game to overtime. It was his third miss of the day. Both teams traded punts on their opening possession in overtime. On their second possession, the Dolphins, who got the ball around midfield to start the drive, reached the endzone after a few plays and won the game.

With the loss, the Browns fell to 0–3.

==== Week 4: at Washington Redskins ====
Week Four: Cleveland Browns at Washington Redskins – Game summary

Quarter	1	2	3	4	Total
Browns	0	17	3	0	**20**
**Redskins**	14	3	0	14	**31**

at FedExField, Landover, Maryland

- Date: October 2
- Game time: 1:00 pm. EDT
- Game weather: 67 °F (19 °C), cloudy
- Game attendance: 76,249
- Referee: Jeff Triplette
- TV announcers (CBS): Kevin Harlan and Rich Gannon
- Recap, Gamebook

Game information

**First quarter**

- WAS – Jordan Reed 8-yard pass from Kirk Cousins (Dustin Hopkins kick), 7:40. Redskins 7–0. **Drive: 12 plays, 75 yards, 7:20.**
- WAS – Jordan Reed 9-yard pass from Kirk Cousins (Dustin Hopkins kick), 0:27. Redskins 14–0. **Drive: 8 plays, 80 yards, 4:14.**

**Second quarter**

- CLE – Isaiah Crowell 2-yard run (Cody Parkey kick), 9:33. Redskins 14–7. **Drive: 12 plays, 81 yards, 5:54.**
- CLE – Terrelle Pryor 9-yard pass from Cody Kessler (Cody Parkey kick), 7:55. Tied 14–14. **Drive: 3 plays, 12 yards, 1:25.**
- WAS – Dustin Hopkins 49-yard field goal, 2:29. Redskins 17–14. **Drive: 10 plays, 32 yards, 5:26.**
- CLE – Cody Parkey 51-yard field goal, 0:00. Tied 17–17. **Drive: 7 plays, 42 yards, 2:29.**

**Third quarter**

- CLE – Cody Parkey 45-yard field goal, 9:25. Browns 20–17. **Drive: 11 plays, 48 yards, 5:35.**

**Fourth quarter**

- WAS – Chris Thompson 5-yard pass from Kirk Cousins (Dustin Hopkins kick), 10:39. Redskins 24–20' Drive: 10 plays, 91 yards, 5:28
- WAS – Matt Jones 1-yard run (Dustin Hopkins kick), 4:25. Redskins 31–20. **Drive: 4 plays, 39 yards, 2:03.**

**Top passers**

- CLE – Cody Kessler – 28/40, 223 yards, TD, INT
- WAS – Kirk Cousins – 21/27, 183 yards, 3 TD, INT

**Top rushers**

- CLE – Isaiah Crowell – 15 rushes, 112 yards, TD
- WAS – Matt Jones – 22 rushes, 117 yards, TD

**Top receivers**

- CLE – Gary Barnidge – 7 receptions, 57 yards
- WAS – Jordan Reed – 9 receptions, 73 yards, 2 TD

The Browns came to Washington for a matchup against the Redskins. The Browns had a 20–17 lead going into the fourth quarter but the offense once again stalled with a Josh Norman interception and two touchdowns by the Redskins' offense would win the game for the Redskins.

With the loss, the Browns started their season 0–4 for the first time since 2012. Wins by the Jaguars, Bears, and Saints would make the Browns the only team in the NFL without a victory through Week 4.

==== Week 5: vs. New England Patriots ====
Week Five: New England Patriots at Cleveland Browns – Game summary

Quarter	1	2	3	4	Total
**Patriots**	16	7	7	3	**33**
Browns	7	0	0	6	**13**

at FirstEnergy Stadium, Cleveland, Ohio

- Date: October 9
- Game time: 1:00 pm. EDT
- Game weather: 58 °F (14 °C), sunny
- Game attendance: 67,431
- Referee: Bill Vinovich
- TV announcers (CBS): Greg Gumbel, Trent Green and Jamie Erdahl
- Recap, Gamebook

Game information

**First quarter**

- NE – LeGarrette Blount 1-yard run (Stephen Gostkowski kick), 10:28. Patriots 7–0. **Drive: 8 plays, 80 yards, 3:13.**
- CLE – Andrew Hawkins 11-yard pass from Cody Kessler (Cody Parkey kick), 6:09. Tied 7–7. **Drive: 9 plays, 75 yards, 4:19.**
- NE – Martellus Bennett 7-yard pass from Tom Brady (Stephen Gostkowski kick), 2:06. Patriots 14–7. **Drive: 8 plays, 75 yards, 4:03.**
- NE – Cody Kessler fumble out of bounds in end zone for a safety, 1:20. Patriots 16–7.

**Second quarter**

- NE – Martellus Bennett 5 -yard pass from Tom Brady (Stephen Gostkowski kick), 12:10. Patriots 23–7. **Drive: 8 plays, 64 yards, 4:10.**

**Third quarter**

- NE – Martellus Bennett 37-yard pass from Tom Brady (Stpehen Gostkowski kick), 12:24. Patriots 30–7. **Drive: 8 plays, 75 yards, 2:36.**

**Fourth quarter**

- CLE – Connor Hamlett 17-yard pass from Charlie Whitehurst (pass failed), 14:05. Patriots 30–13. **Drive 7 plays, 80 yards, 3:22.**
- NE – Stephen Gostkowski 31-yard field goal, 7:42. Patriots 33–13. **Drive 11 plays, 72 yards, 6:23.**

**Top passers**

- NE – Tom Brady – 28/40, 406 yards, 3 TD
- CLE – Charlie Whitehurst – 14/24, 182 yards, TD, INT

**Top rushers**

- NE – LeGarrette Blount – 18 rushes, 37 yards, TD
- CLE – Isaiah Crowell – 13 rushes, 22 yards

**Top receivers**

- NE – Chris Hogan – 4 receptions, 114 yards
- CLE – Gary Barnidge – 5 receptions, 76 yards

With Tom Brady back from his four-game suspension due to his alleged role in Deflategate, the Browns hosted the Patriots. The game turned out to be a disaster for the Browns as Brady and the Pats destroyed the Browns defense.

Their second loss to New England since 2013 dropped the Browns to 0–5.

==== Week 6: at Tennessee Titans ====
Week Six: Cleveland Browns at Tennessee Titans – Game summary

Quarter	1	2	3	4	Total
Browns	6	7	0	13	**26**
**Titans**	7	7	7	7	**28**

at Nissan Stadium, Nashville, Tennessee

- Date: October 16
- Game time: 1:00 pm. EDT/12:00 p.m. CDT
- Game weather: 75 °F (24 °C), sunny
- Game attendance: 60,897
- Referee: Carl Cheffers
- TV announcers (CBS): Tom McCarthy and Adam Archuleta
- Recap, Gamebook

Game information

**First quarter**

- TEN – Rishard Matthews 11-yard pass from Marcus Mariota (Ryan Succop kick), 10:37. Titans 7–0. **Drive: 7 plays, 75 yards, 4:23.**
- CLE – Cody Parkey 45-yard field goal, 8:47. Titans 7–3. **Drive: 5 plays, 48 yards, 1:50.**
- CLE – Cody Parkey 37-yard field goal, 2:08. Titans 7–6. **Drive: 8 plays, 71 yards, 4:53.**

**Second quarter**

- TEN – Kendall Wright 48-yard pass from Marcus Mariota (Ryan Succop kick), 11:41. Titans 14–6. **Drive: 4 plays, 59 yards, 2:16.**
- CLE – Terrelle Pryor 7-yard pass from Cody Kessler (Cody Parkey kick), 0:40. Titans 14–13. **Drive: 9 plays, 94 yards, 3:49.**

**Third quarter**

- TEN – DeMarco Murray 3-yard run (Ryan Succop kick), 9:33. Titans 21–13. **Drive: 7 plays, 70 yards, 3:36.**

**Fourth quarter**

- TEN – Anthony Fasano 15-yard pass from Marcus Mariota (Ryan Succop kick), 6:43. Titans 28–13. **Drive: 12 plays, 80 yards, 6:59.**
- CLE – Terrelle Pryor 5-yard pass from Cody Kessler (pass failed), 2:07. Titans 28–19. **Drive: 13 plays, 75 yards, 4:36.**
- CLE – Duke Johnson 1-yard run (Cody Parkey kick), 0:27. Titans 28–26. **Drive: 9 plays, 62 yards, 1:40.**

**Top passers**

- CLE – Cody Kessler – 26/41, 336 yards, 2 TD
- TEN – Marcus Mariota – 17/24, 284 yards, 3 TD, INT

**Top rushers**

- CLE – Duke Johnson – 4 rushes, 18 yards, TD
- TEN – DeMarco Murray – 21 rushes, 65 yards, TD

**Top receivers**

- CLE – Terrelle Pryor – 9 receptions, 75 yards, 2 TD
- TEN – Kendall Wright – 8 receptions, 133 yards, TD

With the loss, the Browns dropped to 0–6 and became the first NFL team to start 0–6 since the Oakland Raiders in 2014. It was the Browns' first 0–6 start since the 1999 season.

==== Week 7: at Cincinnati Bengals ====
Week Seven: Cleveland Browns at Cincinnati Bengals – Game summary

Quarter	1	2	3	4	Total
Browns	0	10	7	0	**17**
**Bengals**	7	14	10	0	**31**

at Paul Brown Stadium, Cincinnati, Ohio

- Date: October 23
- Game time: 1:00 pm. EDT
- Game weather: 65 °F (18 °C), sunny
- Game attendance: 65,047
- Referee: Ed Hochuli
- TV announcers (CBS): Andrew Catalon, Steve Beuerlein and Steve Tasker
- Recap, Gamebook

Game information

**First quarter**

- CIN – Giovani Bernard 5-yard run (Mike Nugent kick), 12:14. Bengals 7–0. **Drive: 7 plays, 75 yards, 2:46.**

**Second quarter**

- CLE – Cody Parkey 28-yard field goal, 13:26. Bengals 7–3. **Drive: 10 plays, 60 yards, 5:16.**
- CLE – Isaiah Crowell 1-yard run (Cody Parkey kick), 6:20. Browns 10–7. **Drive: 9 plays, 70 yards, 5:39.**
- CIN – Brandon LaFell 44-yard pass from Andy Dalton (Mike Nugent kick), 4:09. Bengals 14–10. **Drive: 5 plays, 80 yards, 2:11.**
- CIN – A. J. Green 48-yard pass from Andy Dalton (Mike Nugent kick), 0:00. Bengals 21–10. **Drive: 7 plays, 85 yards, 1:03.**

**Third quarter**

- CLE – Kevin Hogan 28-yard run (Cody Parkey kick), 10:43. Bengals 21–17. **Drive: 8 plays, 75 yards, 4:17.**
- CIN – Jeremy Hill 74-yard run (Mike Nugent kick), 9:47. Bengals 28–17. **Drive: 2 plays, 75 yards, 0:56.**
- CIN – Mike Nugent 36-yard field goal, 4:19. Bengals 31–17. **Drive: 7 plays, 66 yards, 3:16.**

**Fourth quarter**

- No scoring plays

**Top passers**

- CLE – Kevin Hogan – 12/24, 100 yards, 2 INT
- CIN – Andy Dalton – 19/28, 308 yards, 2 TD

**Top rushers**

- CLE – Kevin Hogan – 7 rushes, 104 yards, TD
- CIN – Jeremy Hill – 9 rushes, 168 yards, TD

**Top receivers**

- CLE – Gary Barnidge – 6 receptions, 66 yards
- CIN – A. J. Green – 8 receptions, 169 yards, TD

With their fourth straight loss to the Bengals, the Browns started 0–7 for the first time since 1999.

==== Week 8: vs. New York Jets ====
Week Eight: New York Jets at Cleveland Browns – Game summary

Quarter	1	2	3	4	Total
**Jets**	0	7	14	10	**31**
Browns	10	10	0	8	**28**

at FirstEnergy Stadium, Cleveland, Ohio

- Date: October 30
- Game time: 1:00 pm. EDT
- Game weather: 53 °F (12 °C), rain
- Game attendance: 67,431
- Referee: Pete Morelli
- TV announcers (CBS): Kevin Harlan and Rich Gannon
- Recap, Gamebook

Game information

**First quarter**

- CLE – Andrew Hawkins 5-yard pass from Josh McCown (Cody Parkey kick), 11:45. Browns 7–0. **Drive: 8 plays, 75 yards, 3:15.**
- CLE – Cody Parkey 41-yard field goal, 3:11. Browns 10–0. **Drive: 8 plays, 59 yards, 3:42.**

**Second quarter**

- NYJ – Bilal Powell 35-yard run (Nick Folk kick), 12:44. Browns 10–7. **Drive: 12 plays, 87 yards, 5:27.**
- CLE – Isaiah Crowell 1-yard run (Cody Parkey kick), 1:51. Browns 17–7. **Drive: 9 plays, 70 yards, 4:40**
- CLE – Cody Parkey 27-yard field goal, 0:00. Browns 20–7. **Drive: 6 plays, 49 yards, 1:25.**

**Third quarter**

- NYJ – Quincy Enunwa 24-yard pass from Ryan Fitzpatrick (Nick Folk kick), 8:15. Browns 20–14. **Drive: 12 plays, 78 yards, 6:45.**
- NYJ – Matt Forte 4-yard run (Nick Folk kick), 2:11. Jets 21–20. **Drive: 8 plays, 84 yards, 3:03.**

**Fourth quarter**

- NYJ – Matt Forte 2-yard run (Nick Folk kick), 9:38. Jets 28–20. **Drive: 13 plays, 81 yards, 6:27.**
- NYJ – Nick Folk 24-yard field goal, 4:04. Jets 31–20. **Drive: 4 plays, 2 yards, 1:09.**
- CLE – Andrew Hawkins 1-yard pass from Josh McCown (Josh McCown–Terrelle Pryor pass), 0:12. Jets 31–28. **Drive: 14 plays, 84 yards, 3:52.**

**Top passers**

- NYJ – Ryan Fitzpatrick – 16/34, 228 yards, TD
- CLE – Josh McCown – 25/49, 341 yards, 2 TD, 2 INT

**Top rushers**

- NYJ – Matt Forte – 25 rushes, 82 yards, 2 TD
- CLE – Isaiah Crowell – 11 rushes, 29 yards, TD

**Top receivers**

- NYJ – Quincy Enunwa – 4 receptions, 93 yards, TD
- CLE – Terrelle Pryor – 6 receptions, 101 yards

Hoping to stop a 10-game losing streak dating back to last year, the Browns hosted the Jets in an AFC duel. The Browns led 20–7 at halftime. However, they gave up 24 unanswered points to fall behind 31–20 in the 4th quarter. They also committed two turnovers in the 4th quarter. The Browns scored late in the 4th quarter to cut the deficit to 31–28, but a comeback could not be secured as the Jets secured the onside kick, ran out the clock, and dropped the Browns to 0–8. It was only their second 0–8 start in franchise history and the first 0–8 start since the 1975 season. With the loss, the Browns failed to have a winning record for the ninth consecutive season. They also tied a franchise record (first set in between the 2011 and 2012 seasons) for most consecutive losses (11) in franchise history. They would also be the first team to start 0–8 since the 2014 Raiders.

==== Week 9: vs. Dallas Cowboys ====
Week Nine: Dallas Cowboys at Cleveland Browns – Game summary

Quarter	1	2	3	4	Total
**Cowboys**	7	14	14	0	**35**
Browns	3	7	0	0	**10**

at FirstEnergy Stadium, Cleveland, Ohio

- Date: November 6
- Game time: 1:00 pm. EST
- Game weather: 58 °F (14 °C), clear
- Game attendance: 67,431
- Referee: Jeff Triplette
- TV announcers (Fox): Thom Brennaman, Charles Davis, Chris Spielman and Peter Schrager
- Recap, Gamebook

Game information

**First quarter**

- CLE – Cody Parkey 31-yard field goal, 12:40. Browns 3–0. **Drive: 6 plays, 62 yards, 2:20.**
- DAL – Jason Witten 26-yard pass from Dak Prescott (Dan Bailey kick), 6:47. Cowboys 7–3. **Drive: 10 plays, 75 yards, 5:53.**

**Second quarter**

- DAL – Ezekiel Elliott 10-yard run (Dan Bailey kick), 10:02. Cowboys 14–3. **Drive: 9 plays, 69 yards, 4:48.**
- DAL – Cole Beasley 6-yard pass from Dak Prescott (Dan Bailey kick), 1:50. Cowboys 21–3. **Drive: 9 plays, 67 yards, 4:39.**
- CLE – Terrelle Pryor 12-yard pass from Cody Kessler (Cody Parkey kick), 0:23. Cowboys 21–10. **Drive: 7 plays, 80 yards, 1:27.**

**Third quarter**

- DAL – Ezekiel Elliott 8-yard run (Dan Bailey kick), 11:30. Cowboys 28–10. **Drive: 7 plays, 75 yards, 3:30.**
- DAL – Gavin Escobar 2-yard pass from Dak Prescott (Dan Bailey kick), 1:41. Cowboys 35–10. **Drive: 9 plays, 64 yards, 5:30.**

**Fourth quarter**

- No scoring plays

**Top passers**

- DAL – Dak Prescott – 21/27, 247 yards, 3 TD
- CLE – Cody Kessler – 19/27, 203 yards, TD

**Top rushers**

- DAL – Ezekiel Elliott – 18 rushes, 92 yards, 2 TD
- CLE – Duke Johnson – 5 rushes, 30 yards

**Top receivers**

- DAL – Jason Witten – 8 receptions, 134 yards, TD
- CLE – Isaiah Crowell – 4 receptions, 63 yards

Attempting to stop their 11-game losing streak, the Cleveland Browns hosted the Dallas Cowboys. The Cowboys routed the Browns 35–10.

With the loss, the Browns dropped to 0–9 for the first time since 1975 and clinched their ninth consecutive losing season. They also lost their 12th consecutive game, setting a new franchise record for most consecutive losses.

==== Week 10: at Baltimore Ravens ====
Week Ten: Cleveland Browns at Baltimore Ravens – Game summary

Quarter	1	2	3	4	Total
Browns	0	7	0	0	**7**
**Ravens**	0	6	15	7	**28**

at M&T Bank Stadium, Baltimore, Maryland

- Date: November 10
- Game time: 8:25 pm. EST
- Game weather: 54 °F (12 °C), fair
- Game attendance: 70,921
- Referee: Jerome Boger
- TV announcers (NFLN): Al Michaels, Cris Collinsworth and Heather Cox
- Recap, Gamebook

Game information

**First quarter**

- No scoring plays

**Second quarter**

- BAL – Justin Tucker 25-yard field goal, 10:29. Ravens 3–0. **Drive: 8 plays, 41 yards, 3:53.**
- CLE – Seth DeValve 25-yard pass from Cody Kessler (Cody Parkey kick), 6:30. Browns 7–3. **Drive: 7 plays, 75 yards, 3:59.**
- BAL – Justin Tucker 40-yard field goal, 0:00. Browns 7–6. **Drive: 12 plays, 57 yards, 1:39.**

**Third quarter**

- BAL – Darren Waller 4-yard pass from Joe Flacco (Justin Tucker kick), 9:36. Ravens 13–7. **Drive: 9 plays, 64 yards, 3:58.**
- BAL – Steve Smith Sr. 11-yard pass from Joe Flacco (Joe Flacco–Kyle Juszczyk pass), 2:05. Ravens 21–7. **Drive: 6 plays, 43 yards, 2:57.**

**Fourth quarter**

- BAL – Breshad Perriman 27-yard pass from Joe Flacco (Justin Tucker kick), 6:21. Ravens 28–7. **Drive: 12 plays, 90 yards, 7:27.**

**Top passers**

- CLE – Cody Kessler – 11/18, 91 yards, TD
- BAL – Joe Flacco – 30/41, 296 yards, 3 TD, 2 INT

**Top rushers**

- CLE – Isaiah Crowell – 9 rushes, 23 yards
- BAL – Terrance West – 21 rushes, 65 yards

**Top receivers**

- CLE – Terrelle Pryor – 5 receptions, 48 yards
- BAL – Breshad Perriman – 3 receptions, 64 yards, TD

Trying to halt their 12-game losing streak that had started back during the 2015 NFL season, the Browns traveled to Baltimore to play against the Baltimore Ravens who beat them in Week 2. This was the Browns' only prime time game this year. The Browns led 7–6 at halftime, but the Ravens dominated the second half, outscoring them 22–0 and winning 28–7. The seven points scored by the Browns represented their fewest points scored in a game this season.

With the loss, the Browns fell to 0–10. It was their worst start in franchise history. They are also the first team to begin the season 0–10 since the 2014 Oakland Raiders. The Browns' overall NFL record fell to 461–461–10, marking the first time in franchise history they did not have a record above .500.

==== Week 11: vs. Pittsburgh Steelers ====
Week Eleven: Pittsburgh Steelers at Cleveland Browns – Game summary

Quarter	1	2	3	4	Total
**Steelers**	3	11	3	7	**24**
Browns	0	0	3	6	**9**

at FirstEnergy Stadium, Cleveland, Ohio

- Date: November 20
- Game time: 1:00 pm. EST
- Game weather: 36 °F (2 °C), cloudy
- Game attendance: 67,431
- Referee: Brad Allen
- TV announcers (CBS): Kevin Harlan and Rich Gannon
- Recap, Gamebook

Game information

**First quarter**

- PIT – Chris Boswell 32-yard field goal, 2:28. Steelers 3–0. **Drive: 16 plays, 82 yards, 9:18.**

**Second quarter**

- PIT – Chris Boswell 33-yard field goal, 4:43. Steelers 6–0. **Drive: 16 plays, 68 yards, 9:28.**
- PIT – Le'Veon Bell 1-yard run (Ben Roethlisberger–David Johnson pass), 0:00. Steelers 14–0. **Drive: 11 plays, 59 yards, 1:51.**

**Third quarter**

- CLE – Cody Parkey 24-yard field goal, 8:05. Steelers 14–3. **Drive: 11 plays, 48 yards, 5:00.**
- PIT – Chris Boswell 22-yard field goal, 0:03. Steelers 17–3. **Drive: 15 plays, 71 yards, 8:02.**

**Fourth quarter**

- CLE – Gary Barnidge 14-yard pass from Josh McCown (kick failed, wide right), 9:45. Steelers 17–9. **Drive: 11 plays, 75 yards, 5:18.**
- PIT – Javon Hargrave fumble recovery in the end zone (Chris Boswell kick), 3:36. Steelers 24–9.

**Top passers**

- PIT – Ben Roethlisberger – 23/36, 167 yards
- CLE – Cody Kessler – 7/14, 128 yards, INT

**Top rushers**

- PIT – Le'Veon Bell – 28 rushes, 146 yards, TD
- CLE – Josh McCown – 2 rushes, 11 yards

**Top receivers**

- PIT – Antonio Brown – 8 receptions, 76 yards
- CLE – Terrelle Pryor – 5 receptions, 97 yards

The Browns hosted the Pittsburgh Steelers, who were coming off a loss against the Cowboys. The Steelers defeated the Browns 24–9, dropping the Browns to 0–11. With the loss, the Browns were mathematically eliminated from postseason contention for the 14th consecutive season. For the second consecutive season, they were the first NFL team to be mathematically eliminated from contention. The Browns have now gone 24 consecutive seasons without winning a division title, extending the longest active streak in the NFL. They also extended their current franchise record for most consecutive games lost to 14 games. The team is also the first team to start 0–11 since the 2011 Indianapolis Colts.

==== Week 12: vs. New York Giants ====
Week Twelve: New York Giants at Cleveland Browns – Game summary

Quarter	1	2	3	4	Total
**Giants**	0	14	0	13	**27**
Browns	0	6	0	7	**13**

at FirstEnergy Stadium, Cleveland, Ohio

- Date: November 27
- Game time: 1:00 pm. EST
- Game weather: 48 °F (9 °C), sunny
- Game attendance: 60,034
- Referee: Walt Anderson
- TV announcers (Fox): Dick Stockton, Matt Millen and Peter Schrager
- Recap, Gamebook

Game information

**First quarter**

- No scoring plays

**Second quarter**

- NYG – Dwayne Harris 13-yard pass from Eli Manning (Robbie Gould kick), 7:03. Giants 7–0. **Drive: 2 plays, 31 yards, 0:42.**
- CLE – Cody Parkey 20-yard field goal, 1:43. Giants 7–3. **Drive: 10 plays, 28 yards, 3:51.**
- NYG – Odell Beckham Jr. 32-yard pass from Eli Manning (Robbie Gould kick), 1:13. Giants 14–3. **Drive: 4 plays, 69 yards, 0:30.**
- CLE – Cody Parkey 25-yard field goal, 0:00. Giants 14–6. **Drive: 8 plays, 68 yards, 1:13.**

**Third quarter**

- No scoring plays

**Fourth quarter**

- NYG – Jason Pierre-Paul 48-yard fumble return (kick failed, wide right), 10:58. Giants 20–6.
- CLE – Corey Coleman 21-yard pass from Josh McCown (Cody Parkey kick), 8:17. Giants 20–13. **Drive: 5 plays, 75 yards, 2:41.**
- NYG – Odell Beckham Jr. 4-yard pass from Eli Manning (Robbie Gould kick), 5:10. Giants 27–13. **Drive: 6 plays, 73 yards, 3:07.**

**Top passers**

- NYG – Eli Manning – 15/27, 194 yards, 3 TD
- CLE – Josh McCown – 25/43, 322 yards, TD

**Top rushers**

- NYG – Rashad Jennings – 15 rushes, 55 yards
- CLE – Isaiah Crowell – 16 rushes, 44 yards

**Top receivers**

- NYG – Odell Beckham Jr. – 6 receptions, 96 yards, 2 TD
- CLE – Terrelle Pryor – 6 receptions, 131 yards

The Browns took on the Giants who were on a five-game winning streak and were coming off their 22–16 win over the Bears, but the Browns suffered their 12th straight loss this season due to three touchdown passes by Eli Manning to Odell Beckham Jr. and a fumble return by Jason Pierre-Paul for a touchdown.

With the loss, the Browns went into their bye week at 0–12. They would be the first team to start with such a record since the 2011 Colts.

==== Week 14: vs. Cincinnati Bengals ====
Week Fourteen: Cincinnati Bengals at Cleveland Browns – Game summary

Quarter	1	2	3	4	Total
**Bengals**	13	7	0	3	**23**
Browns	0	0	7	3	**10**

at FirstEnergy Stadium, Cleveland, Ohio

- Date: December 11
- Game time: 1:00 pm. EST
- Game weather: 28 °F (−2 °C), snow
- Game attendance: 60,028
- Referee: Gene Steratore
- TV announcers (CBS): Andrew Catalon, Steve Beuerlein and Steve Tasker
- Recap, Gamebook

Game information

**First quarter**

- CIN – Tyler Eifert 14-yard pass from Andy Dalton (Mike Nugent kick), 12:21. Bengals 7–0. **Drive: 6 plays, 73 yards, 2:39.**
- CIN – Jeremy Hill 1-yard run (kick short), 6:27. Bengals 13–0. **Drive: 9 plays, 45 yards, 4:49.**

**Second quarter**

- CIN – Tyler Eifert 5-yard pass from Andy Dalton (Mike Nugent kick), 5:06. Bengals 20–0. **Drive: 5 plays, 26 yards, 2:37.**

**Third quarter**

- CLE – Robert Griffin III 1-yard run (Cody Parkey kick), 8:11. Bengals 20–7. **Drive: 10 plays, 80 yards, 4:40.**

**Fourth quarter**

- CLE – Cody Parkey 30-yard field goal, 14:14. Bengals 20–10. **Drive: 10 plays, 69 yards, 4:06.**
- CIN – Mike Nugent 44-yard field goal, 8:38. Bengals 23–10. **Drive: 11 plays, 57 yards, 5:36.**

**Top passers**

- CIN – Andy Dalton – 20/28, 180 yards, 2 TD
- CLE – Robert Griffin III – 12/28, 104 yards, INT

**Top rushers**

- CIN – Jeremy Hill – 25 rushes, 111 yards, TD
- CLE – Isaiah Crowell – 10 rushes, 113 yards

**Top receivers**

- CIN – Tyler Boyd – 6 receptions, 49 yards
- CLE – Gary Barnidge – 3 receptions, 27 yards

Coming off their bye week, the Browns hosted the Bengals in a rematch of Week 7. The Bengals jumped out to a 20–0 halftime lead and never looked back, handing Cleveland a 23–10 loss.

With the loss, Cleveland became the eighth team since 1960 to start a season 0–13, and the first since the 2011 Indianapolis Colts. They became the first franchise to lose 16 in a row since the Oakland Raiders did it during the 2013 and 2014 seasons.

==== Week 15: at Buffalo Bills ====
Week Fifteen: Cleveland Browns at Buffalo Bills – Game summary

Quarter	1	2	3	4	Total
Browns	3	0	10	0	**13**
**Bills**	10	7	7	9	**33**

at New Era Field, Orchard Park, New York

- Date: December 18
- Game time: 1:00 pm. EST
- Game weather: 25 °F (−4 °C), cloudy
- Game attendance: 66,529
- Referee: Clete Blakeman
- TV announcers (CBS): Tom McCarthy and Adam Archuleta
- Recap, Gamebook

Game information

**First quarter**

- BUF – Dan Carpenter 21-yard field goal, 10:14. Bills 3–0. **Drive: 7 plays, 44 yards, 3:06.**
- CLE – Cody Parkey 35-yard field goal, 3:50. Tied 3–3. **Drive: 12 plays, 63 yards, 6:24.**
- BUF – Mike Gillislee 3-yard run (Dan Carpenter kick), 0:00. Bills 10–3. **Drive: 8 plays, 74 yards, 3:50.**

**Second quarter**

- BUF – Charles Clay 19-yard pass from Tyrod Taylor (Dan Carpenter kick), 0:34. Bills 17–3. **Drive: 13 plays, 91 yards, 7:29.**

**Third quarter**

- CLE – Robert Griffin III 18-yard run (Cody Parkey kick), 8:58. Bills 17–10. **Drive: 8 plays, 80 yards, 3:54.**
- BUF – LeSean McCoy 3-yard run (Dan Carpenter kick), 5:50. Bills 24–10. **Drive: 6 plays, 75 yards, 3:08.**
- CLE – Cody Parkey 40-yard field goal, 1:32. Bills 24–13. **Drive: 8 plays, 45 yards, 4:18.**

**Fourth quarter**

- BUF – LeSean McCoy 8-yard run (kick failed, wide right), 12:38. Bills 30–13. **Drive: 8 plays, 75 yards, 3:54.**
- BUF – Dan Carpenter 34-yard field goal, 7:21. Bills 33–13. **Drive: 7 plays, 34 yards, 4:00.**

**Top passers**

- CLE – Robert Griffin III – 17/28, 196 yards
- BUF – Tyrod Taylor – 17/24, 174 yards, TD

**Top rushers**

- CLE – Robert Griffin III – 8 rushes, 48 yards, TD
- BUF – LeSean McCoy – 19 rushes, 153 yards, 2 TD

**Top receivers**

- CLE – Duke Johnson – 5 receptions, 62 yards
- BUF – Charles Clay – 7 receptions, 72 yards, TD

The Browns headed to Buffalo to try to collect their first win of the season, but the Bills routed the Browns 33–13. With the loss, the Browns fell to 0–14 (0-4 against the AFC East) and became the first team to lose 17 consecutive regular season games since the St. Louis Rams in the 2008 and 2009 seasons. The Browns also became the fourth team to start a season 0–14, joining the 1976 Tampa Bay Buccaneers, 1980 New Orleans Saints, and the 2008 Detroit Lions. The Browns also tied their franchise record for total losses in a single season. The Browns also became the first team since the 2013 Houston Texans to have 14 straight losses in a single season.

On December 21, OT Joe Thomas was voted to his 10th consecutive Pro Bowl. Thomas now holds the Browns record for most Pro Bowls, passing Pro Football Hall of Famers Jim Brown and Lou Groza, who each have nine. Thomas joins Pro Football Hall of Famers Merlin Olsen (14), Mel Renfro (10), Barry Sanders (10) and Lawrence Taylor (10) as the only players in NFL history to make the Pro Bowl in each of their first 10 seasons. Thomas' streak of 10 consecutive Pro Bowls was the longest active streak in the NFL.

==== Week 16: vs. San Diego Chargers ====
Week Sixteen: San Diego Chargers at Cleveland Browns – Game summary

Quarter	1	2	3	4	Total
Chargers	10	0	7	0	**17**
**Browns**	7	10	3	0	**20**

at FirstEnergy Stadium, Cleveland, Ohio

- Date: December 24
- Game time: 1:00 pm. EST
- Game weather: 38 °F (3 °C), cloudy
- Game attendance: 57,272
- Referee: Walt Coleman
- TV announcers (CBS): Spero Dedes and Solomon Wilcots
- Recap, Gamebook

Game information

**First quarter**

- SD – Antonio Gates 1-yard pass from Philip Rivers (Josh Lambo kick), 10:49. Chargers 7–0. **Drive: 8 plays, 75 yards, 4:11.**
- CLE – Isaiah Crowell 8-yard run (Cody Parkey kick), 5:12. Tied 7–7. **Drive: 10 plays, 72 yards, 5:37.**
- SD – Josh Lambo 43-yard field goal, 1:49. Chargers 10–7. **Drive: 7 plays, 50 yards, 3:23.**

**Second quarter**

- CLE – Isaiah Crowell 4-yard run (Cody Parkey kick), 12:39. Browns 14–10. **Drive: 10 plays, 75 yards, 4:10.**
- CLE – Cody Parkey 49-yard field goal, 4:46. Browns 17–10. **Drive: 10 plays, 39 yards, 4:49.**

**Third quarter**

- CLE – Cody Parkey 27-yard field goal, 10:58. Browns 20–10. **Drive: 8 plays, 57 yards, 4:02.**
- SD – Tyrell Williams 1-yard pass from Philip Rivers (Josh Lambo kick), 6:04. Browns 20–17. **Drive: 11 plays, 75 yards, 4:54.**

**Fourth quarter**

- No scoring plays

**Top passers**

- SD – Philip Rivers – 23/46, 322 yards, 2 TD, INT
- CLE – Robert Griffin III – 17/25, 164 yards

**Top rushers**

- SD – Kenneth Farrow – 9 rushes, 28 yards
- CLE – Isaiah Crowell – 16 rushes, 54 yards, 2 TD

**Top receivers**

- SD – Antonio Gates – 8 receptions, 94 yards, TD
- CLE – Gary Barnidge – 5 receptions, 42 yards

In their final home game of the year, the Browns hosted the San Diego Chargers on Christmas Eve afternoon, looking to get their first win. The contest was competitive throughout the afternoon. The Chargers had a game-tying field goal attempt blocked by Jamie Meder with just under 4 minutes to go in the fourth quarter. After the Browns punted, the Chargers drove down the field and reached the Browns’ 27-yard line in the final seconds. However, the Chargers had no timeouts remaining and had to rush the field goal unit out in the final seconds. Kicker Josh Lambo missed the potential game-tying field goal as time expired, allowing the Browns to pick up their first win of the season.

With the win, the Browns improved to 1–14 and ended their 17-game losing streak while finishing the season 1–7 at home. This was the first and only time this season that the Browns allowed fewer than 23 points in a single game. After this game, the Browns endured a 19-game winless streak and did not win again until Week 3 of the 2018 season.

==== Week 17: at Pittsburgh Steelers ====
Week Seventeen: Cleveland Browns at Pittsburgh Steelers – Game summary

Quarter	1	2	3	4	OT	Total
Browns	7	7	0	7	3	**24**
**Steelers**	0	7	0	14	6	**27**

at Heinz Field, Pittsburgh, Pennsylvania

- Date: January 1, 2017
- Game time: 1:00 pm. EST
- Game weather: 41 °F (5 °C), sunny
- Game attendance: 55,921
- Referee: John Hussey
- TV announcers (CBS): Kevin Harlan and Rich Gannon
- Recap, Gamebook

Game information

**First quarter**

- CLE – Seth DeValve 12-yard pass from Robert Griffin III (Cody Parkey kick), 7:48. Browns 7–0. **Drive: 8 plays, 55 yards, 4:18.**

**Second quarter**

- CLE – Gary Barnidge 4-yard pass from Robert Griffin III (Cody Parkey kick), 9:21. Browns 14–0. **Drive: 11 plays, 67 yards, 5:42.**
- PIT – DeAngelo Williams 11-yard pass from Landry Jones (Chris Boswell kick), 0:31. Browns 14–7. **Drive: 7 plays, 37 yards, 1:30.**

**Third quarter**

- No scoring plays

**Fourth quarter**

- PIT – DeAngelo Williams 1-yard run (Chris Boswell kick), 13:21. Tied 14–14. **Drive: 10 plays, 80 yards, 5:01.**
- PIT – Demarcus Ayers 11-yard pass from Landry Jones (Chris Boswell kick), 5:14. Steelers 21–14. **Drive: 5 plays, 61 yards, 2:20.**
- CLE – George Atkinson III 5-yard run (Cody Parkey kick), 3:28. Tied 21–21. **Drive: 3 plays, 68 yards, 1:46.**

**Overtime**

- CLE – Cody Parkey 34-yard field goal, 7:17. Browns 24–21. **Drive: 17 plays, 65 yards, 7:43.**
- PIT – Cobi Hamilton 26-yard pass from Landry Jones, 2:57. Steelers 27–24. **Drive: 9 plays, 75 yards, 4:20.**

**Top passers**

- CLE – Robert Griffin III – 29/40, 232 yards, 2 TD, INT
- PIT – Landry Jones – 24/37, 277 yards, 3 TD, INT

**Top rushers**

- CLE – Isaiah Crowell – 19 rushes, 152 yards
- PIT – DeAngelo Williams – 23 rushes, 67 yards, TD

**Top receivers**

- CLE – Terrelle Pryor – 7 receptions, 94 yards
- PIT – Eli Rogers – 6 receptions, 61 yards

The Browns entered this game looking to win consecutive games for the first time since they won three in a row during Weeks 8 to 10 of the 2014 season. The Steelers entered the game locked into the AFC's #3 seed and rested most of their starters. However, the Browns would still fall to the Steelers, losing 27–24 in an overtime affair. With the loss, the Browns finished the season at 1–15 (0-8 on the road), their worst record in franchise history (until the next season). The Browns also became the tenth team in NFL history, but the first since the 2009 Rams, to finish 1–15. They failed to win a division game for the first time since the 2011 season and extended their losing streak within the division to 11 games. The Browns also failed to win a road game in a season for only the second time in franchise history and the first since the 1975 season. They also extended their road losing streak to 13 games and failed to win a road game against the Steelers for the 13th consecutive season. The Browns finished with the worst record in the NFL and secured the #1 overall pick in the 2017 NFL Draft. This marked the beginning of a 17-game losing streak continuing through the 2017 season and ending with a tie in Week 1 of the 2018 season.

== Standings ==
=== Division ===
AFC North
	W	L	T	PCT	DIV	CONF	PF	PA	STK
^{(3)} Pittsburgh Steelers	11	5	0	.688	5–1	9–3	399	327	W7
Baltimore Ravens	8	8	0	.500	4–2	7–5	343	321	L2
Cincinnati Bengals	6	9	1	.406	3–3	5–7	325	315	W1
Cleveland Browns	1	15	0	.063	0–6	1–11	264	452	L1

=== Conference ===
AFC
#	Team	Division	W	L	T	PCT	DIV	CONF	SOS	SOV	STK
Division leaders
1	New England Patriots	East	14	2	0	.875	5–1	11–1	.439	.424	W7
2 (Note: Kansas City clinched the AFC West division over Oakland based on head-to-head sweep.)	Kansas City Chiefs	West	12	4	0	.750	6–0	9–3	.508	.479	W2
3	Pittsburgh Steelers	North	11	5	0	.688	5–1	9–3	.494	.423	W7
4 (Note: Houston clinched the AFC South division title over Tennessee based on record vs. division opponents.)	Houston Texans	South	9	7	0	.563	5–1	7–5	.502	.427	L1
Wild Cards
5	Oakland Raiders	West	12	4	0	.750	3–3	9–3	.504	.443	L1
6	Miami Dolphins	East	10	6	0	.625	4–2	7–5	.455	.341	L1
Did not qualify for the postseason
7 (Note: Tennessee finished ahead of Denver based on head-to-head victory.)	Tennessee Titans	South	9	7	0	.563	2–4	6–6	.465	.458	W1
8	Denver Broncos	West	9	7	0	.563	2–4	6–6	.549	.455	W1
9 (Note: Baltimore finished ahead of Indianapolis based on record vs. conference opponents.)	Baltimore Ravens	North	8	8	0	.500	4–2	7–5	.498	.363	L2
10	Indianapolis Colts	South	8	8	0	.500	3–3	5–7	.492	.406	W1
11	Buffalo Bills	East	7	9	0	.438	1–5	4–8	.482	.339	L2
12	Cincinnati Bengals	North	6	9	1	.406	3–3	5–7	.521	.333	W1
13 (Note: The New York Jets finished ahead of San Diego based record vs. common opponents — the Jets' cumulative record against Cleveland, Indianapolis, Kansas City and Miami was 1–4, while San Diego's cumulative record against the same four teams was 0–5.)	New York Jets	East	5	11	0	.313	2–4	4–8	.518	.313	W1
14	San Diego Chargers	West	5	11	0	.313	1–5	4–8	.543	.513	L5
15	Jacksonville Jaguars	South	3	13	0	.188	2–4	2–10	.527	.417	L1
16	Cleveland Browns	North	1	15	0	.063	0–6	1–11	.549	.313	L1
Tiebreakers (Note: When breaking ties for three or more teams under the NFL's rules, they are first broken within divisions, then comparing only the highest ranked remaining team from each division.)
