= Derrick Kindred =

American football player (born 1993)

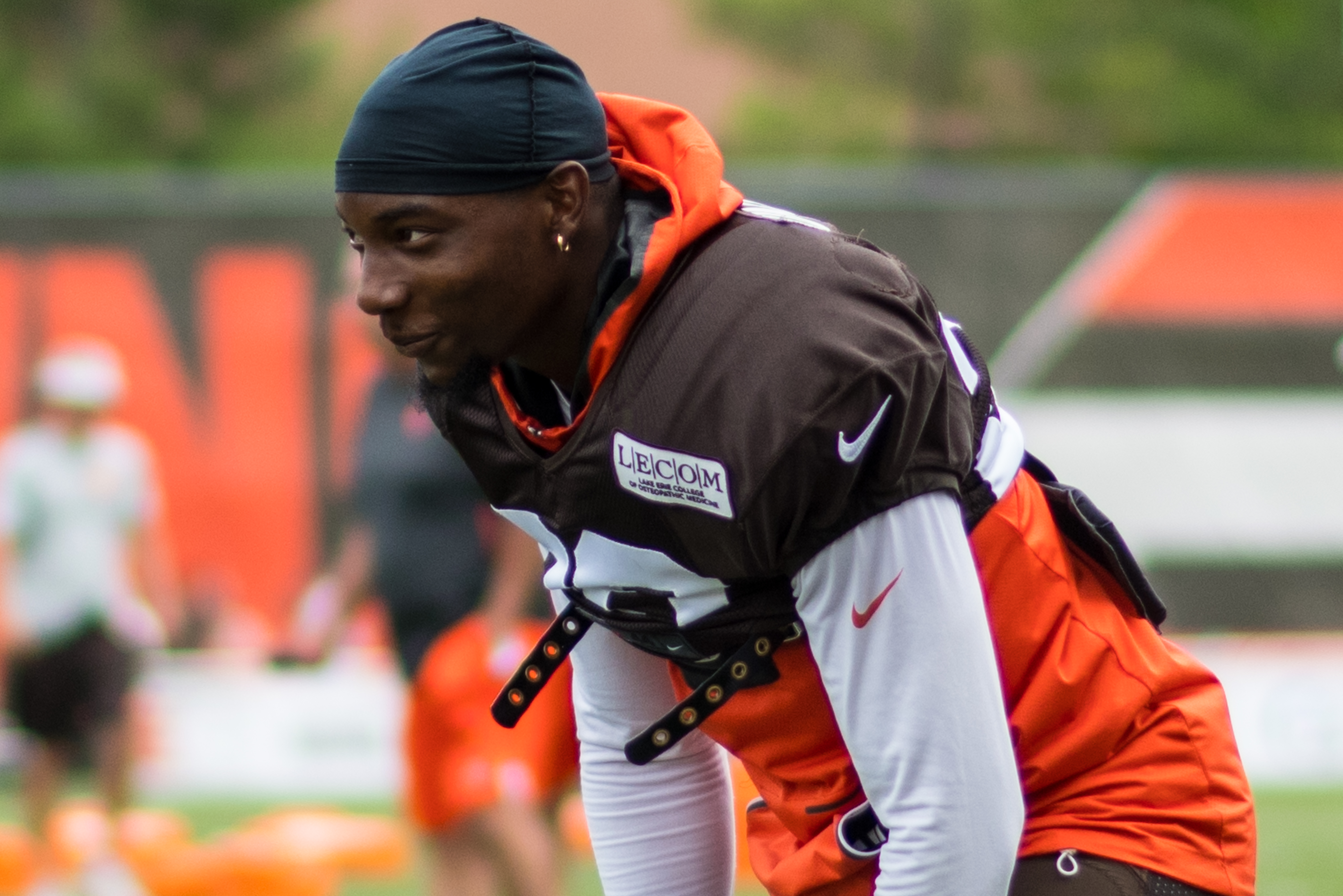
- Kindred with the Cleveland Browns in 2018

No. 30, 26, 36, 38
- Position: Safety

Personal information
- Born: December 15, 1993 (age 32); San Antonio, Texas, U.S.
- Listed height: 5 ft 10 in (1.78 m)
- Listed weight: 208 lb (94 kg)

Career information
- High school: Karen Wagner (San Antonio)
- College: TCU
- NFL draft: 2016: 4th round, 129th overall pick

Career history
- Cleveland Browns (2016–2018); Indianapolis Colts (2019)*; New York Jets (2019)*; San Francisco 49ers (2020)*
- * Offseason or practice squad member only

Awards and highlights
- First-team All-Big 12 (2015)

Career NFL statistics
- Total tackles: 148
- Forced fumbles: 1
- Pass deflections: 12
- Interceptions: 2
- Stats at Pro Football Reference

Derrick Dwayne Kindred Jr. (born December 15, 1993) is an American former professional football player who was a safety in the National Football League (NFL). He played college football for the TCU Horned Frogs, and was selected by the Cleveland Browns in the fourth round of the 2016 NFL draft.

== Early life ==
Derrick Dwayne Kindred, Jr. was born December 15, 1993, in San Antonio, Texas, to Derrick Kindred, Sr. and his then-wife, Karen Randle. His father was a truck driver, and his mother was a physical therapist (although later she became a pharmacy technician). His parents divorced, and Kindred was raised by his mother and attended Karen Wagner High School in San Antonio. In high school, Kindred was both an offensive and defensive player. As an offensive running back, Kindred rushed for 1,604 yards (1,467 m) and scored 14 touchdowns in his senior year. On defense that same season, he had 71 tackles, two sacks, and returned two kickoffs for touchdowns. He was named the best two-way player among all Class 5A schools by the San Antonio Express-News in 2011. At 5 feet 9 inches (1.75 m) and 180 pounds (82 kg) during the college draft, Kindred was only recruited by the University of Texas at San Antonio (UTSA), which was just beginning to put together a football program. Kindred initially committed to UTSA as part of its inaugural recruiting class. Before National Signing Day, Baylor University and Texas Christian University (TCU) expressed interest in him. Kindred changed his commitment to TCU just before the commitment deadline.

== College career ==
At TCU, Kindred started one game as a freshman in 2012 and three as a sophomore in 2013. He was a full-time starter in his junior and senior years, starting all 26 games. In his junior season, Kindred had four interceptions and 80 tackles. He had two interceptions and 87 tackles his senior year, and was the second leading tackler on the team. He ended his college career with 50 games, 235 tackles, eight interceptions, and two touchdowns, and was named a First-team All-Conference selection and an Honorable Mention All-Big 12 by Big 12 Conference coaches.

Kindred played his entire senior season with a broken left collarbone. He tripped over a fellow player during practice three days before the season opener against the University of Minnesota. Physicians assessed the injury, and said Kindred could continue to play, albeit with additional padding.

Members of the TCU football team called Kindred "Peanut", a nickname given to him by quarterback Trevone Boykin after the shape of Kindred's head.

== Professional career ==
Pre-draft measurables
Height	Weight	Arm length	Hand span	40-yard dash	10-yard split	20-yard split	20-yard shuttle	Three-cone drill	Vertical jump	Broad jump	Bench press
5 ft 10 in (1.78 m)	207 lb (94 kg)	31 1/4 in (0.79 m)	9 3/8 in (0.24 m)	4.50 s	1.57 s	2.62 s	4.29 s	7.05 s	37 1/2 in (0.95 m)	10 ft 3 in (3.12 m)	17 reps
All values from NFL Combine

=== Cleveland Browns ===
==== 2016 ====
The Cleveland Browns selected Kindred in the fourth round (129th overall) of the 2016 NFL draft. He was the 11th safety selected in 2016. On May 26, 2016, the signed Kindred to a four-year, $2.83 million contract that includes a signing bonus of $499,356.

Throughout training camp, Kindred performed well and impressed coaches enough in the preseason to warrant a competition against Jordan Poyer for the starting free safety job. Head coach Hue Jackson named Poyer the starting free safety and Kindred the backup strong safety behind Ibraheim Campbell to start the regular season.

He made his professional regular season debut in the Browns season-opener at the Philadelphia Eagles and recorded six combined tackles in the 29–10 loss. On September 25, 2016, Kindred earned his first career start after Ibraheim Campbell was out with a hamstring injury. He made four combined tackles during the Browns' 30–24 loss to the Miami Dolphins. On November 6, 2016, he collected a season-high six combined tackles during the Browns' 35–10 loss to the Dallas Cowboys. In Week 11, Kindred made six combined tackles and a season-high two pass deflections during a 24–9 loss to the Pittsburgh Steelers. During the bye week in Week 13, he broke his ankle while training and was placed on the reserve/non-football injury list on December 7, 2016. He appeared in all 12 games with five starts and finished his rookie season with 46 combined tackles (32 solos) and five passes defensed.

==== 2017 ====
Throughout training camp, Kindred competed against Ibraheim Campbell and Calvin Pryor for the job as the starting strong safety. He was named the starting strong safety to begin the regular season.

He played in the Browns' season-opener Steelers and made three combined tackles and recorded his first career interception off of a pass attempt by Ben Roethlisberger during their 21–18 loss. The interception occurred in the fourth quarter and stopped a potential scoring drive for the Steelers, who were on the Browns' 29-yard line before the play. The following week, he recorded a season-high seven combined tackles in the Browns' 24–10 loss to the Baltimore Ravens. On December 17, 2017, Kindred made four combined tackles and a season-high two pass deflections in Cleveland's 27–10 loss to the Ravens. Unfortunately, he suffered a wrist injury and was placed on injured reserve on December 19, 2017. He played in 14 games with 10 starts, recording 57 combined tackles (43 solos), seven passes defensed, and one interception.

Kindred was waived by the Browns on April 1, 2019.

=== Indianapolis Colts ===
On April 2, 2019, Kindred was claimed off waivers by the Indianapolis Colts. He was released on August 19, 2019.

=== New York Jets ===
On August 20, 2019, Kindred was claimed off waivers by the New York Jets. He was waived on August 31, 2019.

=== San Francisco 49ers ===
On January 4, 2020, Kindred signed a reserve/future contract with the San Francisco 49ers. He was waived on July 28, 2020.
