= Corey Coleman =

American football player (born 1994)

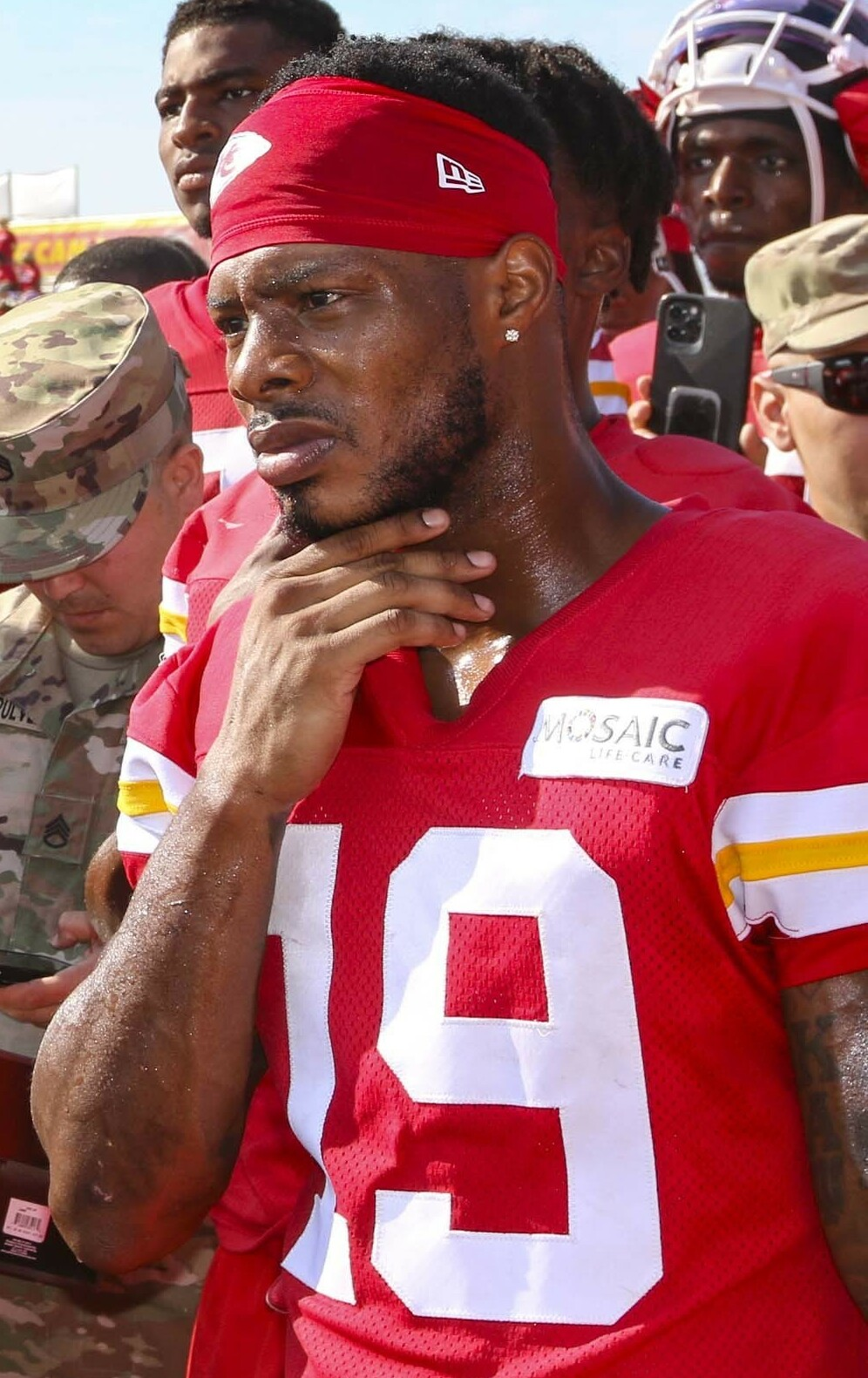
- Coleman with the Kansas City Chiefs in 2022

TCU Horned Frogs
- Title: Assistant wide receivers coach

Personal information
- Born: July 6, 1994 (age 32); Dallas, Texas, U.S.
- Listed height: 5 ft 11 in (1.80 m)
- Listed weight: 185 lb (84 kg)

Career information
- Position: Wide receiver (No. 19)
- High school: J. J. Pearce (Richardson, Texas)
- College: Baylor (2012–2015)
- NFL draft: 2016: 1st round, 15th overall pick

Career history

Playing
- Cleveland Browns (2016–2017); Buffalo Bills (2018)*; New England Patriots (2018); New York Giants (2018–2020); Kansas City Chiefs (2022)*; Philadelphia Stars (2023); Michigan Panthers (2024)*
- * Offseason or practice squad member only

Coaching
- TCU (2025–present) Assistant wide receivers coach

Awards and highlights
- All-USFL Team (2023); USFL receiving yards leader (2023); USFL receptions leader (2023); Fred Biletnikoff Award (2015); Unanimous All-American (2015); 2× First-team All-Big 12 (2014, 2015)

Career NFL statistics
- Receptions: 61
- Receiving yards: 789
- Receiving touchdowns: 5
- Stats at Pro Football Reference

Corey Defians Coleman (born July 6, 1994) is an American football coach and former professional wide receiver who is currently the assistant wide receivers coach for TCU.

Coleman played college football for the Baylor Bears, earning unanimous All-American honors in 2015. He was selected by the Cleveland Browns in the first round of the 2016 NFL draft. After two seasons with the Browns, he was traded to the Buffalo Bills. He also played in the National Football League (NFL) for the New England Patriots, New York Giants, and Kansas City Chiefs. Coleman also played one year for the Philadelphia Stars of the USFL in 2023, leading the league in receiving yards.

== Early life ==
Coleman attended J. J. Pearce High School in Richardson, Texas, where he was a three-sport star in football, basketball and track. In football, he excelled as a rusher, receiver and returner under head coach Randy Robertson and was named first-team 2011 All-Area by The Dallas Morning News SportsDay (as WR/RB/QB) and earned 2011 first-team Class 4A All-State and District 10-4A MVP honors as a wide receiver. As a sophomore, he totaled 707 yards and 10 touchdowns on 91 rushes as well as 19 receptions for 229 yards and one more score, earning second-team All-District 10-4A honors. He had 69 receptions for 1,003 yards and 11 touchdowns as well as 97 carries for 426 yards and 13 touchdowns as junior in 2010; he also made two interceptions at cornerback en route to 2010 All-District 10-4A honors. As a senior in 2011, he totaled 69 receptions for 932 yards and 11 touchdowns, 567 yards and 15 touchdowns on 84 rushes and threw for 106 yards on 5-of-6 passing. In his final three seasons, Coleman amassed 3,864 all-purpose yards and 61 touchdowns. Following his senior season, he was selected to play for the 2012 U.S. Under-19 National Football Team in the February International Bowl (formerly known as Team USA vs. The World).

Coleman also participated on the track & field team, where he was a standout sprinter and jumper. As a junior in 2011, he placed second at the District 10-4A meet in the triple jump with a leap of 13.70 meters (44 feet 11 inches). He posted a personal-best time of 10.83 seconds in the 100-meter dash at the 48th Annual Jesuit-Sheaner Relays, placing sixth in the finals. At the Region II-4A meet, he recorded a career-best time of 21.76 seconds in the 200-meter dash en route to an 8th-place finish; he was also a finalist in the jumping events, finishing second in the long jump (6.99m or 22'11") and third in the high jump (2.0m or 6'6.75"), while also running the third leg on the 4 × 100 m relay squad, helping them earn a fourth-place finish with a time of 41.97 seconds. Before his senior year, he ran the fastest 40-yard dash (4.32 seconds) at a SPARQ Combine in Oregon, which featured some of the nation's top recruits. As senior in 2012, he finished eighth at Texas UIL 3A state meet in the high jump with a 1.93 m (6 ft 4 in) mark.

Coleman was rated by Rivals.com as a four-star recruit. He committed to Baylor University to play college football.

== College career ==
After redshirting in 2012, Coleman started 10 of 13 games as a redshirt freshman in 2013. For the season, he had 35 receptions for 527 yards and two touchdowns. Coleman missed the first three games of his sophomore season due to a hamstring injury. In his first game back he had 12 receptions for 154 yards and a touchdown. Overall, he appeared in 10 games and recorded 64 receptions for 1,119 yards and 11 touchdowns. During the second game of his junior year in 2015, Coleman set the school record with four touchdown receptions in a single game. Coleman finished the year with 74 catches, 1,363 yards an 18.4 yard average per catch, and 20 touchdowns. Coleman capped off the year by winning the 2015 Fred Biletnikoff Award for the season's outstanding college football receiver. On December 23, 2015, Coleman underwent a sports hernia surgery, causing him to miss the Russell Athletic Bowl. A few days following his surgery, he decided to forgo his senior year and enter the 2016 NFL draft.

== Professional career ==
Pre-draft measurables
Height	Weight	Arm length	Hand span	40-yard dash	10-yard split	20-yard split	Vertical jump	Broad jump	Bench press
5 ft 10 5/8 in (1.79 m)	194 lb (88 kg)	30 1/4 in (0.77 m)	9 in (0.23 m)	4.39 s	1.51 s	2.47 s	40.5 in (1.03 m)	10 ft 9 in (3.28 m)	17 reps
All values from NFL Combine/Baylor's Pro Day

=== Cleveland Browns ===
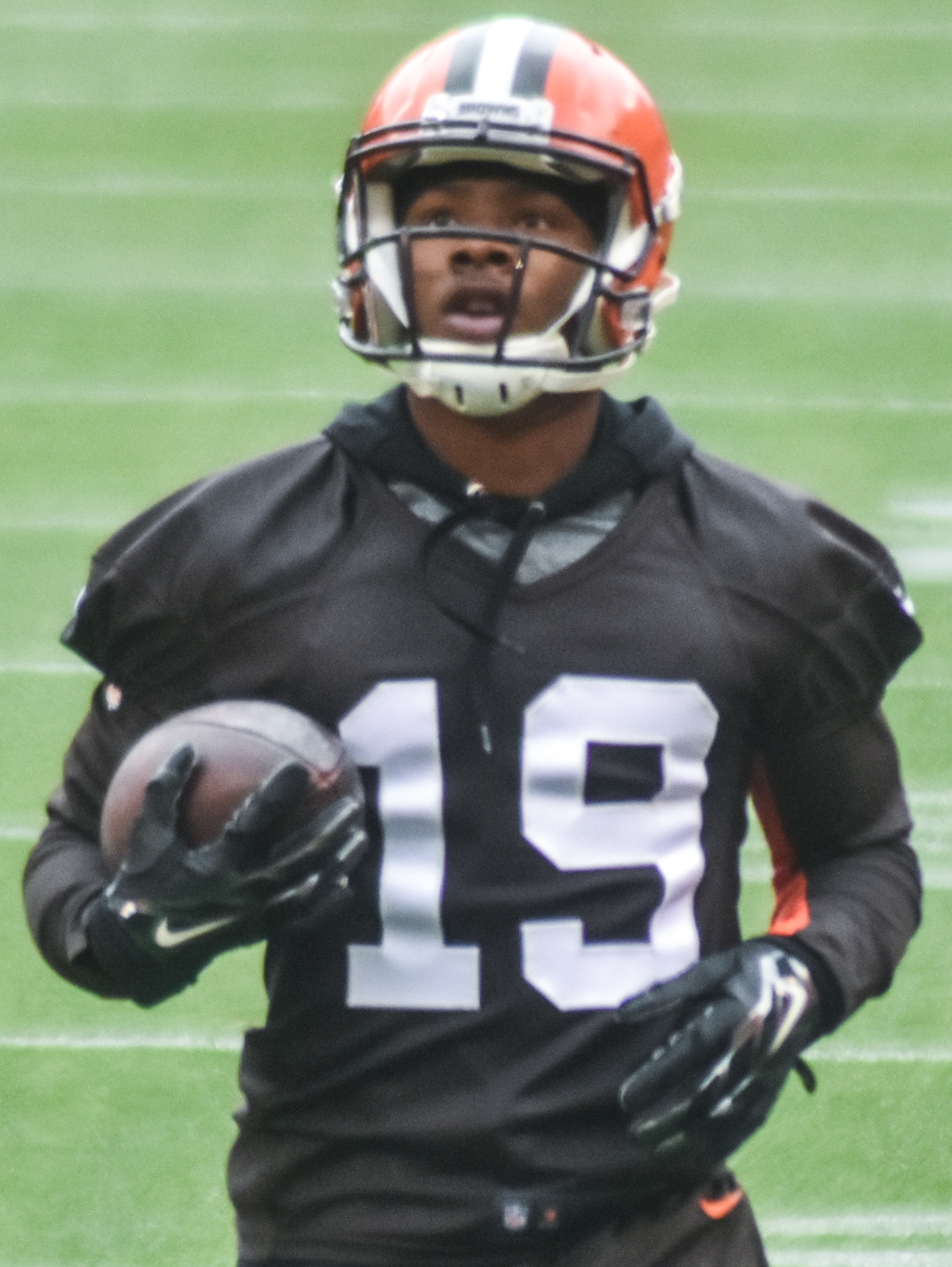
Coleman with the Browns in 2016

Coleman was selected 15th overall by the Cleveland Browns in the 2016 NFL draft. On May 13, 2016, he signed a four-year, $11.65 million contract. Coleman did not play for most of the preseason due to injury, but the Browns expected to start him in the first several games of the season due to the suspension of starting wide receiver Josh Gordon.

In his first regular season game on September 11, 2016, Coleman recorded two receptions for 69 yards. In Week 2 against the Baltimore Ravens, Coleman made five receptions for 104 receiving yards and two touchdowns. Coleman broke his hand during practice on September 21, and was ruled out 4–6 weeks.

In Week 1 of the 2017 season, against the Pittsburgh Steelers, Coleman caught quarterback DeShone Kizer's first career touchdown pass. He finished the game with five receptions for 53 yards. In Week 2 against the Baltimore Ravens, Coleman suffered another broken hand, the same hand that hindered him in the 2016 season. He had surgery on the hand on September 18, 2017, and was ruled out 6–8 weeks. He was placed on injured reserve the next day. He was activated off injured reserve to the active roster on November 16, 2017. On December 31, 2017, he dropped a pass late in the fourth quarter to seal the Browns' 0–16 season.

=== Buffalo Bills ===
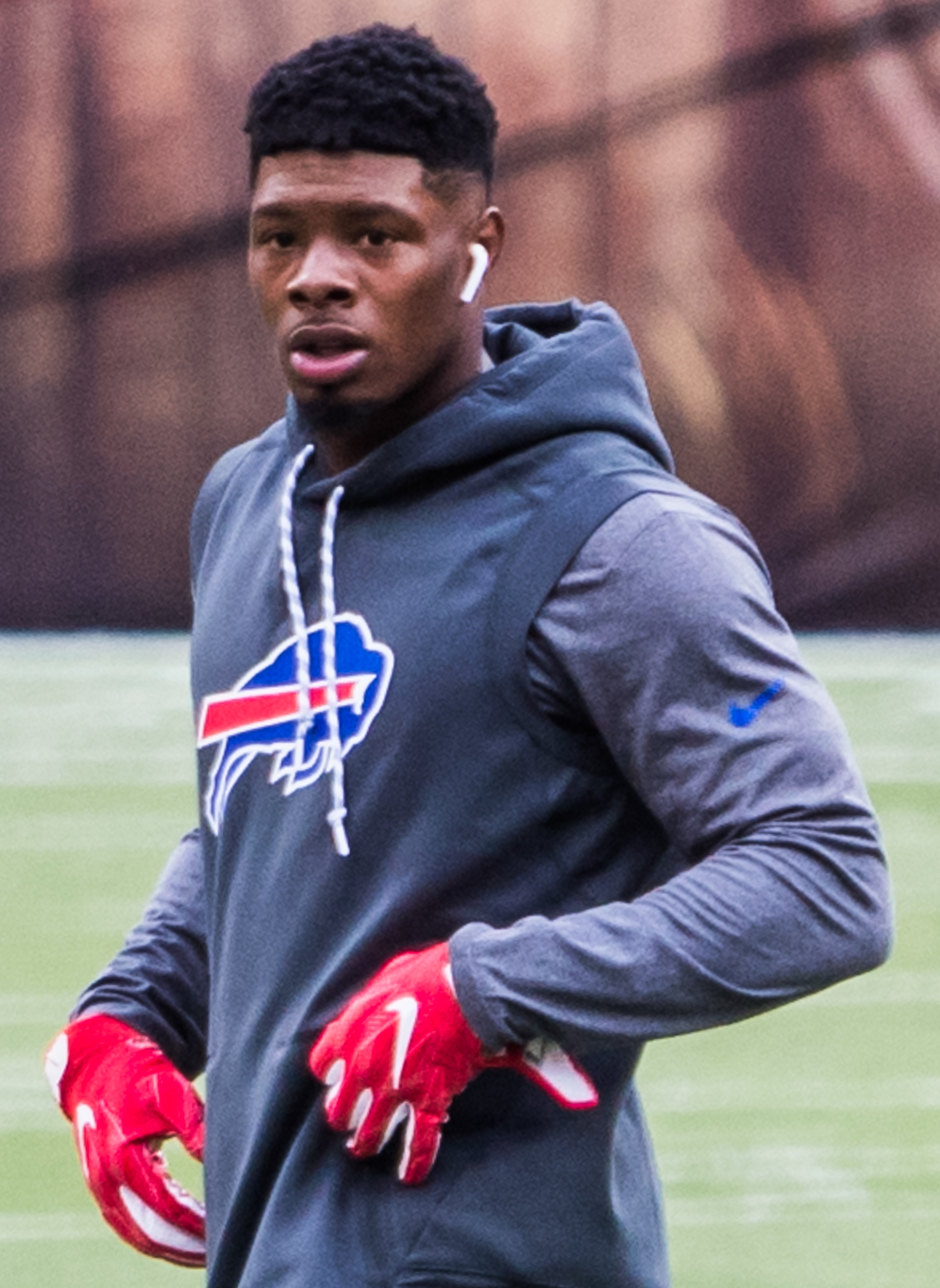
Coleman with the Bills in 2018

During the HBO series Hard Knocks, Coleman became frustrated with not getting any first team reps and demanded to be traded. On August 5, 2018, Coleman was traded to the Buffalo Bills for a 2020 seventh-round pick. He was released by the Bills on September 1, 2018.

=== New England Patriots ===
On September 11, 2018, Coleman was signed by the New England Patriots. Coleman was released on September 17, 2018, to create a roster spot for his former Browns teammate Josh Gordon. On September 20, 2018, Coleman was re-signed to the Patriots practice squad. On September 29, 2018, Coleman was released from the practice squad.

=== New York Giants ===
On October 19, 2018, the New York Giants signed Coleman to their practice squad. On October 25, 2018, he was promoted to the active roster.

Coleman, as a restricted free agent, had a $2.025 million tender placed on him by the Giants on March 7, 2019. On July 25, 2019, Coleman suffered a torn ACL on the first day of training camp with the Giants and was ruled out for the season.

On March 30, 2020, Coleman re-signed with the Giants on a one-year deal. On September 6, 2020, Coleman was released from the Giants. He was re-signed to their practice squad on October 27. On November 24, 2020, the Giants released Coleman from their practice squad.

On January 19, 2021, Coleman was suspended for the first six games of the 2021 season by the NFL for violating the league's performance-enhancing drug policy.

=== Kansas City Chiefs ===
After not playing for the entire 2021 season, Coleman signed with the Kansas City Chiefs on March 24, 2022. Coleman was cut from the team on August 30, 2022. He re-signed to the practice squad on September 13, 2022. He was released on October 4, 2022.

=== Philadelphia Stars ===
On February 17, 2023, Coleman signed with the Philadelphia Stars of the United States Football League (USFL). Coleman led the USFL in receiving yards for the 2023 season. The Stars folded when the XFL and USFL merged to create the United Football League (UFL).

=== Michigan Panthers ===
On January 5, 2024, Coleman was selected by the Michigan Panthers during the 2024 UFL dispersal draft. He was waived on January 30, 2024. On March 4, 2024, it was revealed that Coleman retired from football.

== Career statistics ==
Legend
**Bold**	Career high

=== Professional ===
Year	League	Team	Games		Receiving					Rushing					Return yards					Fumbles	
Year	League	Team	GP	GS	Rec	Yds	Avg	Lng	TD	Att	Yds	Avg	Lng	TD	Ret	Yds	Avg	Lng	TD	Fum	Lost
2016	NFL	CLE	10	10	33	413	12.5	**58**	3	**2**	**10**	**5.0**	**9**	0	0	0	0.0	0	0	0	0
2017	NFL	CLE	9	8	23	305	13.3	44	2	0	0	0.0	0	0	0	0	0.0	0	0	0	0
2018	NFL	NYG	8	1	5	71	**14.2**	30	0	1	5	**5.0**	5	0	**24**	**617**	**25.7**	**51**	0	0	0
2023	USFL	PHI	10	10	**51**	**669**	13.1	56	**4**	0	0	0	0	0	6	126	21.0	42	0	0	0
Career			37	29	112	1,458	13.01	58	9	3	15	5.0	9	0	30	743	24.7	51	0	0	0

=== College ===
Year	Team	GP	Receiving		
Year	Team	GP	Rec	Yds	TD
2013	Baylor	12	35	527	2
2014	Baylor	10	64	1,119	11
2015	Baylor	12	**74**	**1,363**	**20**
College		34	173	3,009	33
