= Ibraheim Campbell =

American football player (born 1992)

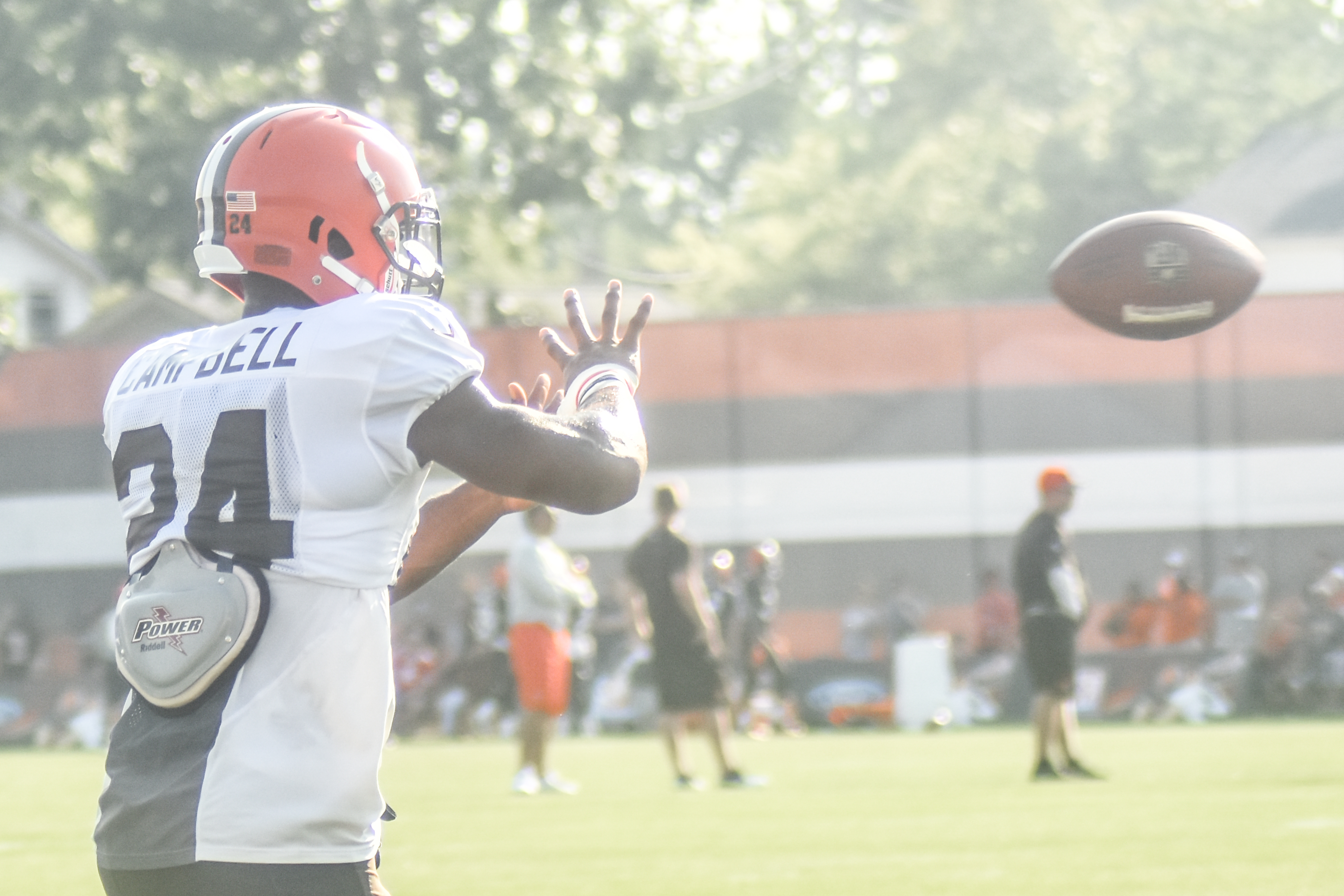
- Campbell with the Cleveland Browns in 2016

No. 30, 24, 39, 20, 35, 33, 36
- Position: Safety

Personal information
- Born: May 13, 1992 (age 34); Philadelphia, Pennsylvania, U.S.
- Listed height: 5 ft 11 in (1.80 m)
- Listed weight: 210 lb (95 kg)

Career information
- High school: Chestnut Hill Academy (Philadelphia)
- College: Northwestern
- NFL draft: 2015: 4th round, 115th overall pick

Career history
- Cleveland Browns (2015–2017); Houston Texans (2017); Dallas Cowboys (2018); New York Jets (2018); Green Bay Packers (2018–2019); Tennessee Titans (2020)*; Indianapolis Colts (2020–2021)
- * Offseason or practice squad member only

Awards and highlights
- Second-team All-Big Ten (2014)

Career NFL statistics
- Total tackles: 116
- Forced fumbles: 2
- Fumble recoveries: 1
- Pass deflections: 1
- Stats at Pro Football Reference

Ibraheim Malcolm-Ramon Campbell (born May 13, 1992) is an American former professional football player who was a safety in the National Football League (NFL). He played college football for the Northwestern Wildcats, and was selected by the Cleveland Browns in the fourth round of the 2015 NFL draft. Campbell was also a member of the Houston Texans, Dallas Cowboys, New York Jets, Green Bay Packers, Tennessee Titans, and Indianapolis Colts.

== Early life ==
Campbell grew up in Cheltenham Township, a township on the northern border of Philadelphia and attended Cheltenham public schools through 8th grade. Campbell then attended Chestnut Hill Academy in Philadelphia for high school, where he starred as both a running back and defensive back.

He rushed for 3,857 yards and 52 touchdowns during his career at running back. As a defensive back, he totaled 135 tackles and nine interceptions. He earned All-league (defensive back), All-state (running back), All-Southeastern Pennsylvania (running back) and All-city (defensive back) honors and was named to the Philadelphia Daily News' All-Decade team as a defensive back (26 players were honored on this team). He was named the Blue Devils' Offensive MVP. He had 1,885 yards and 28 touchdowns his senior season. He scored the game-winning touchdown vs. Haverford with a run in overtime that lifted CHA to the league championship. He was selected to play in Philadelphia's City All-Star game and Pennsylvania's East-West All-Star game, and was voted CHA's "Top Senior Athlete" in 2009–10.

Also a letterman in track & field, mostly in sprints and hurdles. He posted bests of 7.21 seconds in the 60 meters, 11.19 in the 100 meters, 8.60 in the 60m hurdles, 14.57 in the 110m hurdles and also 6.71 meters (22 ft) in the long jump.

Campbell was rated by Rivals.com as a three-star recruit. He committed to Northwestern University to play college football.

== College career ==
Campbell accepted a football scholarship from Northwestern University. As a redshirt freshman, he became a starter at safety, posting 100 tackles (led the team), 3.5 tackles for loss, 2 interceptions, 4 passes defensed and one fumble recovery.

As a sophomore, he was one of the leaders of the defense, registering 89 tackles (fourth on the team), one interception and 12 passes defensed (led the team). As a junior, he tallied 74 tackles (fifth on the team), 2.5 tackles for loss, 1 sack, 4 interceptions (tied for the team lead) and one fumble recovery.

As a senior, he collected 54 tackles (sixth on the team), one tackle for loss, 3 interceptions (tied for the team lead). He finished his college career with 45 starts, 316 tackles, 7.5 tackles for loss, 11 interceptions (tied for third in school history), 24 passes defended (tied for fifth in school history), one sack and one fumble recovery.

== Professional career ==
=== Cleveland Browns ===
Campbell was selected by the Cleveland Browns in the fourth round (115th overall) of the 2015 NFL draft. On May 19, Campbell signed a four-year, $2.79 million contract with the Browns with a $512,010 signing bonus.

In 2016, he started 8 games at strong safety.

In 2017, he appeared in 8 games, starting in 2 of those games. On November 8, he suffered a hamstring injury during practice. He was waived by the Browns and placed on the injured reserve list on November 9. The Browns signed defensive back Derron Smith off the Bengals' practice squad to replace him. Campbell was released with an injury settlement on November 16.

=== Houston Texans ===
On December 13, 2017, Campbell was signed to the Houston Texans' practice squad. He was promoted to the active roster on December 19. On September 1, 2018, Campbell was waived by the Texans.

=== Dallas Cowboys ===
On September 2, 2018, Campbell was claimed off waivers by the Dallas Cowboys. He was waived on October 9, being replaced by Darian Thompson.

=== New York Jets ===
On October 24, 2018, Campbell was signed by the New York Jets. On November 2, fellow safety Rontez Miles was activated and Campbell was waived.

=== Green Bay Packers ===
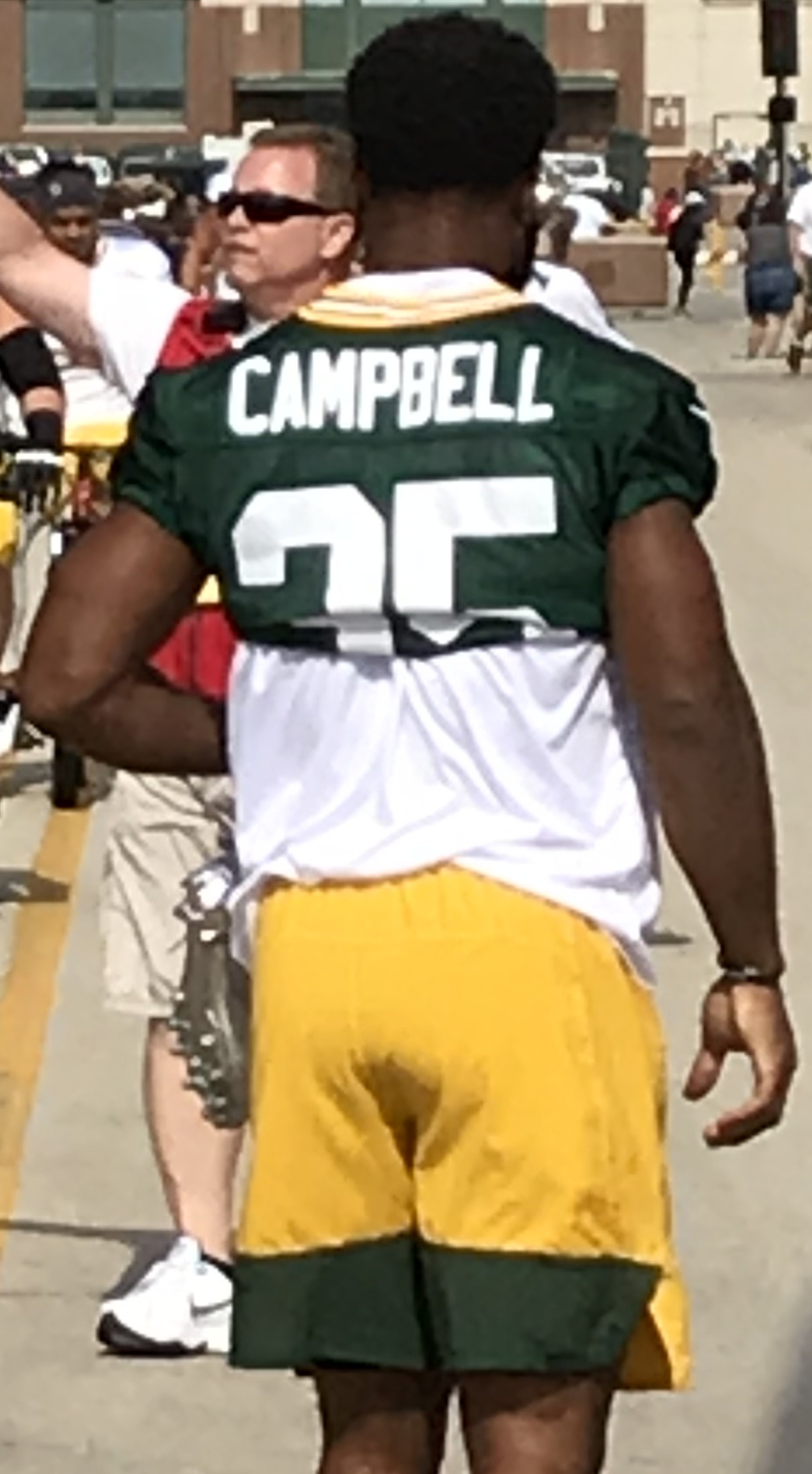
Campbell with the Green Bay Packers in 2019

On November 5, 2018, the Green Bay Packers claimed Campbell off waivers to shore up the secondary after trading Ha Ha Clinton-Dix to the Washington Redskins. On December 2, in a game against the Arizona Cardinals, Campbell suffered an injury. He was placed on injured reserve on December 4, effectively ending his season.

On August 8, 2019, Campbell was re-signed by the Packers. He was placed on the reserve/physically unable to perform (PUP) list on August 31. He was activated off PUP on November 5. On November 10, he made his season debut in a Week 10 victory over the Carolina Panthers, recording three solo tackles and a forced fumble.

=== Tennessee Titans ===
On May 1, 2020, Campbell was signed by the Tennessee Titans. Now a vested veteran (4+ seasons in the NFL, can no longer be waived), he was released on September 5.

=== Indianapolis Colts ===
On September 9, 2020, Campbell was signed to the Indianapolis Colts practice squad. On September 22, Campbell was promoted to the active roster. He was released on October 17, and re-signed to the practice squad on October 20. He was elevated to the active roster on December 13 for the team's Week 14 game against the Las Vegas Raiders, but reverted to the practice squad after the game. He was placed on the practice squad/COVID-19 list by the team on December 16, and restored to the practice squad on December 29. He was elevated to the active roster for the third time on January 2, 2021, for their Week 17 game against the Jacksonville Jaguars. However, he again reverted to the practice squad following the game. On January 10, 2021, Campbell signed a reserve/futures contract with the Colts.

On August 31, 2021, Campbell was waived by the Colts. He re-signed with their practice squad on September 28. On October 11, he was elevated to the active roster for their Week 5 game against the Baltimore Ravens. However, Campbell suffered knee and ankle injuries in their loss, and he was placed on the injured reserve list.

On July 20, 2022, he was reported to be retired.

== NFL career statistics ==
Regular season statistics
| Year | Team | Games | | Tackles | | | | Interceptions | | | | | | Fumbles | |
| Year | Team | GP | GS | Cmb | Solo | Ast | Sck | PD | Int | Yds | Avg | Lng | TD | FF | FR |
|---|---|---|---|---|---|---|---|---|---|---|---|---|---|---|---|
| 2015 | CLE | 15 | 1 | 16 | 13 | 3 | 0.0 | 0 | 0 | 0 | 0 | 0 | 0 | 0 | 0 |
| 2016 | CLE | 14 | 8 | 48 | 34 | 14 | 0.0 | 0 | 0 | 0 | 0 | 0 | 0 | 0 | 0 |
| 2017 | CLE / HOU | 9 | 2 | 18 | 14 | 4 | 0.0 | 1 | 0 | 0 | 0 | 0 | 0 | 0 | 0 |
| 2018 | DAL / NYJ / GB | 8 | 1 | 19 | 16 | 3 | 0.0 | 0 | 0 | 0 | 0 | 0 | 0 | 1 | 1 |
| 2019 | GB | 7 | 3 | 14 | 8 | 6 | 0.0 | 0 | 0 | 0 | 0 | 0 | 0 | 1 | 0 |
| Career | | 53 | 15 | 115 | 85 | 30 | 0.0 | 1 | 0 | 0 | 0 | 0 | 0 | 2 | 1 |
Source: NFL.com

Postseason statistics
| Year | Team | Games | | Tackles | | | | Interceptions | | | | | | Fumbles | |
| Year | Team | GP | GS | Cmb | Solo | Ast | Sck | PD | Int | Yds | Avg | Lng | TD | FF | FR |
|---|---|---|---|---|---|---|---|---|---|---|---|---|---|---|---|
| 2019 | GB | 2 | 0 | 2 | 2 | 0 | 0.0 | 0 | 0 | 0 | 0 | 0 | 0 | 1 | 0 |
| Career | | 2 | 0 | 2 | 2 | 0 | 0.0 | 0 | 0 | 0 | 0 | 0 | 0 | 1 | 0 |
Source: pro-football-reference.com
