= Sashi Brown =

American football executive (born 1976)

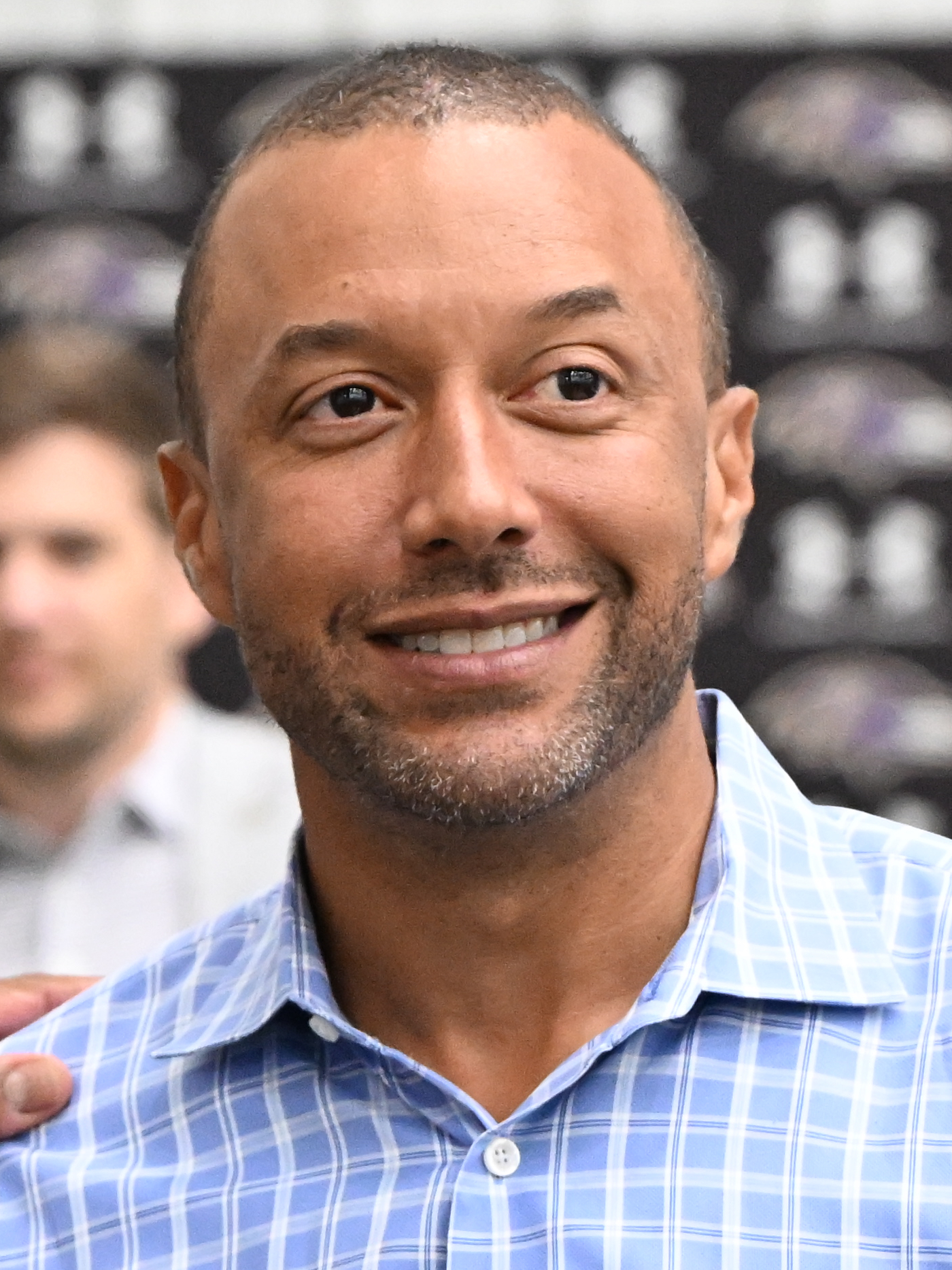
- Brown in 2024

Baltimore Ravens
- Title: President

Personal information
- Born: May 15, 1976 (age 50); Boston, Massachusetts, U.S.

Career information
- College: Hampton University (BA); Harvard Law School (JD)

Career history
- Jacksonville Jaguars (2005–2012) Lead counsel; Cleveland Browns (2013–2017); Executive vice president (2013–2017); General manager (2016–2017); Washington Wizards (2019–2022) President; Baltimore Ravens (2022–present) President
- Executive profile at Pro Football Reference

Sashi Brown (born May 15, 1976) is an attorney and American football executive who is the president of the Baltimore Ravens of the National Football League (NFL). Brown began his NFL career with the Jacksonville Jaguars and Cleveland Browns.

== Career ==
Brown earned a bachelor's degree from Hampton University in 1998, and a Juris Doctor degree from Harvard Law School in 2002. After graduating, Brown was an attorney with Wilmer, Cutler, Pickering, Hale and Dorr, a private law firm based in Washington, D.C. As a member of the firm's corporate law practice group, Brown advised companies in a variety of business transactions. Brown is a member of the New York, District of Columbia and Florida bars. He also runs his own investment firm.

=== Jacksonville Jaguars ===
In addition to his attorney career, he has also served as a sports front office executive. From 2005 to 2012, Brown was the lead counsel for the Jacksonville Jaguars of the National Football League. While working with the Jaguars organization, Brown served as a member of the board of directors and chairman of the Section 8 Subcommittee to the Jacksonville Housing Authority. He also played a role in negotiating the naming rights deal for EverBank Field.

=== Cleveland Browns ===
From 2013 until 2017, he worked as an executive vice president for the Cleveland Browns of the National Football League, effectively making him the de facto general manager for the 2016 season and part of the 2017 season.

=== Washington Wizards ===
In July 2019, he was hired as the chief planning and operations officer and president of Monumental Basketball, which manages the NBA's Washington Wizards and the WNBA's Washington Mystics.

=== Baltimore Ravens ===
In February 2022, Brown was appointed to succeed Dick Cass as Baltimore Ravens president beginning April.
