= 2022 San Francisco 49ers season =

American football team season

- Owner: Jed York
- General manager: John Lynch
- Head coach: Kyle Shanahan
- Offensive coordinator: Kyle Shanahan (de facto)
- Defensive coordinator: DeMeco Ryans
- Home stadium: Levi's Stadium

Results
- Record: 13–4
- Division place: 1st NFC West
- Playoffs: Won Wild Card Playoffs (vs. Seahawks) 41–23; Won Divisional Playoffs (vs. Cowboys) 19–12; Lost NFC Championship (at Eagles) 7–31
- All-Pros: 6: LT Trent Williams (1st team); DE Nick Bosa (1st team); LB Fred Warner (1st team); S Talanoa Hufanga (1st team); TE George Kittle (2nd team); ST George Odum (2nd team)
- Pro Bowlers: 7: RB Christian McCaffrey; FB Kyle Juszczyk; TE George Kittle; T Trent Williams; DE Nick Bosa; MLB Fred Warner; SS Talanoa Hufanga

Uniform
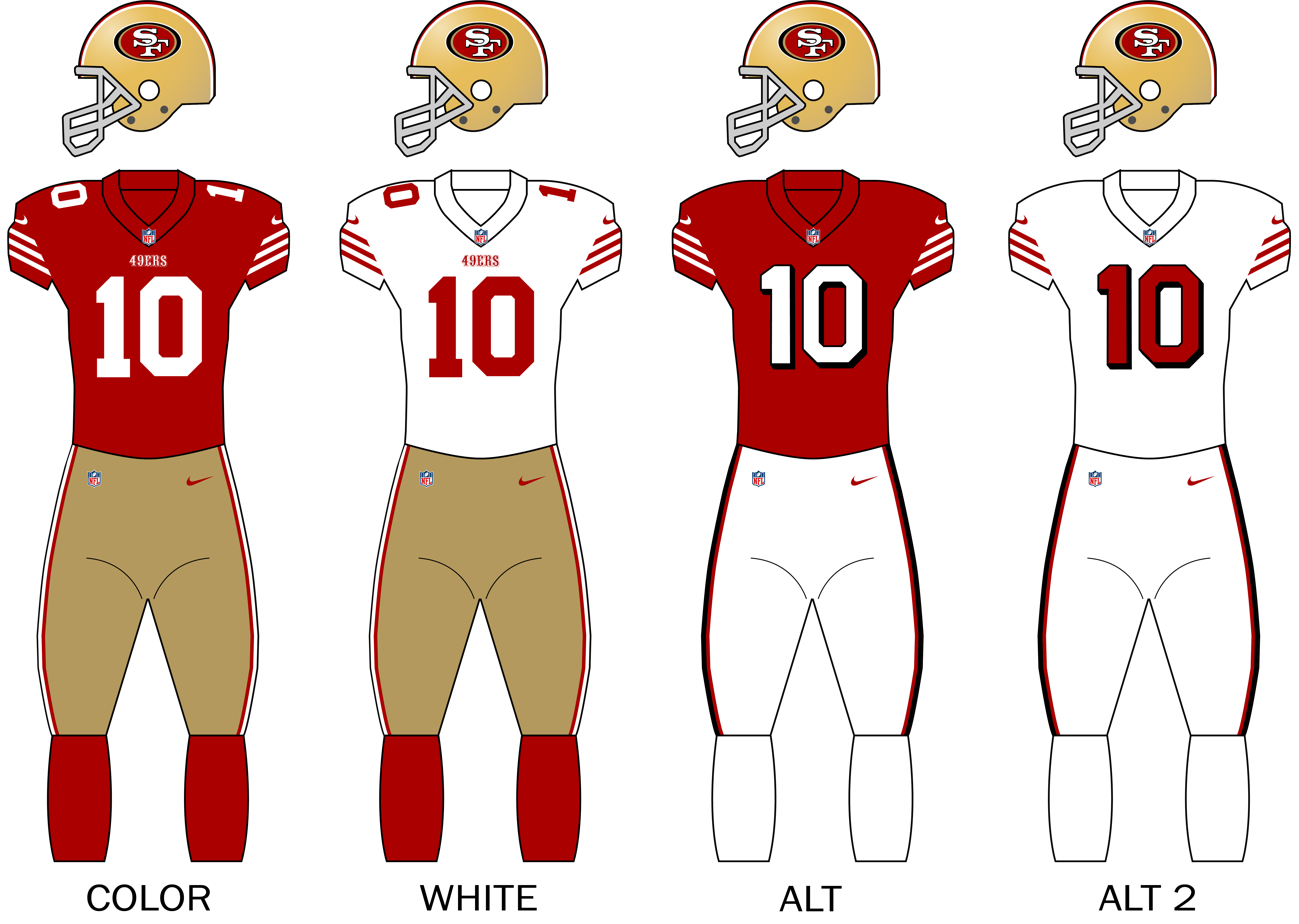

The 2022 season was the San Francisco 49ers' 73rd in the National Football League (NFL), their 77th overall, and their sixth under the head coach/general manager tandem of Kyle Shanahan and John Lynch.

After having an underwhelming start, with notable season-ending injuries, combined with a 3–4 start before the bye week, the 49ers won the rest of their games, improving on their 10–7 record from the previous year after a Week 16 win over the Washington Commanders. With a Week 15 win against the Seattle Seahawks, and with the Rams and Cardinals both being mathematically eliminated from playoff contention, they won the NFC West for the first time since 2019 and clinched a playoff berth, also becoming the NFL's first team this season to win their division. The 49ers swept the NFC West for the first time since 1997, which included sweeping the Seahawks for the first time since 2011. With a 41–23 victory over the Seahawks in the Wild Card round, San Francisco completed a 3–0 sweep of all three games played against Seattle. The next week, the 49ers defeated the Dallas Cowboys 19–12 in the Divisional round, defeating them in the playoffs for the second consecutive season. The 49ers lost to the Philadelphia Eagles 31–7 in the NFC Championship in which injuries to third-stringer Brock Purdy and fourth-stringer Josh Johnson during the game and first-stringer Trey Lance and second-stringer Jimmy Garoppolo previously in the season made the 49ers unable to stay competitive. This was also their worst playoff loss since 2002 against Tampa Bay where they were blown out 31-6 in the Divisional Round.

The season was highlighted by the emergence of rookie quarterback Brock Purdy, taken last in the 2022 NFL draft, who started after an injury to Jimmy Garoppolo (who himself replaced the injured Trey Lance) and went 5–0 as the starter to end the regular season before winning his first two playoff games. The 49ers were well-balanced and dominant on both sides of the ball during the season. On offense, they finished 5th in total offense with 365 yards per game and 6th in scoring, averaging 26.5 points a game, while also finishing first in the league in plus/minus differential with a +173. On defense, they were even more dominant, as they finished first in the league in both total defense and defensive scoring (306 yards per game and 16.3 points per game respectively). They also finished first in the league in turnover differential with a +13, which included 20 interceptions and 10 fumble recoveries.

== Offseason ==
=== Roster changes ===
==== Free agency ====
The 49ers entered free agency with the following:

Position	Player	Free agency tag	Date Signed	2022 Team	Notes
OG	Laken Tomlinson	UFA	March 17, 2022	New York Jets	Signed three-year contract
CB	Jason Verrett	UFA	May 2, 2022	San Francisco 49ers	Signed one-year contract
DT	D. J. Jones	UFA	March 14, 2022	Denver Broncos	Signed three-year contract
RB	Raheem Mostert	UFA	March 17, 2022	Miami Dolphins	Signed one-year contract
CB	K'Waun Williams	UFA	March 23, 2022	Denver Broncos	Signed two-year contract
RB	Jeff Wilson	UFA	March 29, 2022	San Francisco 49ers	Signed one-year contract
TE	Ross Dwelley	UFA	March 28, 2022	San Francisco 49ers	Signed one-year contract
CB	Josh Norman	UFA			
S	Marcell Harris	UFA	April 21, 2022	New York Jets	Signed one-year contract
WR	Mohamed Sanu	UFA	July 26, 2022	Miami Dolphins	Signed two-year contract
FS	Jaquiski Tartt	UFA	June 17, 2022	Philadelphia Eagles	Signed one-year contract
SS	Tavon Wilson	UFA			
OT	Tom Compton	UFA	March 17, 2022	Denver Broncos	Signed one-year contract
CB	Dontae Johnson	UFA	March 23, 2022	San Francisco 49ers	Signed one-year contract
DT	Maurice Hurst Jr.	UFA	March 10, 2022	San Francisco 49ers	Signed one-year contract
DE	Arden Key	UFA	March 30, 2022	Jacksonville Jaguars	Signed one-year contract
DE	Jordan Willis	UFA	March 23, 2022	San Francisco 49ers	Signed one-year contract
WR	Trent Sherfield	UFA	March 18, 2022	Miami Dolphins	Signed one-year contract
RB	Trenton Cannon	UFA	March 18, 2022	Tennessee Titans	Signed one-year contract
OT	Daniel Brunskill	RFA	April 19, 2022	San Francisco 49ers	Signed one-year contract
C	Jake Brendel	RFA	March 9, 2022	San Francisco 49ers	Signed one-year contract
DE	Kentavius Street	UFA	March 18, 2022	New Orleans Saints	Signed one-year contract
LB	Demetrius Flannigan-Fowles	ERFA	March 11, 2022	San Francisco 49ers	Signed one-year contract
RB	JaMycal Hasty	ERFA	March 10, 2022	San Francisco 49ers	Signed one-year contract
WR	Jauan Jennings	ERFA	April 19, 2022	San Francisco 49ers	Signed one-year contract
WR	Richie James	UFA	March 25, 2022	New York Giants	Signed one-year-contract
LB	Azeez Al-Shaair	RFA	April 25, 2022	San Francisco 49ers	Signed one-year contract
DT	Kevin Givens	ERFA	March 10, 2022	San Francisco 49ers	Signed one-year contract
RFA: Restricted free agent, UFA: Unrestricted free agent, ERFA: Exclusive rights free agent LEGEND – Light green background indicates a player has been re-signed by the 49ers. – Light red background indicates a player has departed the 49ers.

==== Signings ====
Position	Player	2021 Team	Date signed	Notes
LB	Oren Burks	Green Bay Packers	March 17, 2022	Signed two-year contract
CB	Charvarius Ward	Kansas City Chiefs	March 17, 2022	Signed three-year contract
DT	Hassan Ridgeway	Philadelphia Eagles	March 21, 2022	Signed one-year contract
WR	Ray-Ray McCloud	Pittsburgh Steelers	March 22, 2022	Signed two-year contract
S	George Odum	Indianapolis Colts	March 22, 2022	Signed three-year contract
DE	Kerry Hyder	Seattle Seahawks	March 24, 2022	Signed one-year contract
CB	Darqueze Dennard		March 25, 2022	Signed one-year contract
WR	Marcus Johnson	Tennessee Titans	April 11, 2022	Signed one-year contract
WR	Malik Turner	Dallas Cowboys	April 11, 2022	Signed one-year contract
DE	Kemoko Turay	Indianapolis Colts	April 18, 2022	Signed one-year contract
TE	Troy Fumagalli		May 17, 2022	Signed one-year contract
TE	Tyler Kroft	New York Jets	May 23, 2022	Signed one-year contract
RB	Frank Gore		June 2, 2022	Signed one-day contract
DT	Robert Nkemdiche	Seattle Seahawks	July 26, 2022	Signed one-year contract
DT	Tomasi Laulile		July 29, 2022	Signed one-year contract
DT	Akeem Spence		August 1, 2022	Signed one-year contract
OT	Jordan Mills	New Orleans Saints	August 6, 2022	Signed one-year contract
WR	Willie Snead	Carolina Panthers	August 6, 2022	Signed one-year contract
CB	Ken Crawley	New Orleans Saints	August 10, 2022	Signed one-year contract
S	Tashaun Gipson	Chicago Bears	August 22, 2022	Signed one-year contract
OG	Blake Hance	Cleveland Browns	August 31, 2022	claimed off waivers
TE	Tyler Kroft		August 31, 2022	Signed one-year contract
DE	Jordan Willis		August 31, 2022	Signed one-year contract

Indicates that the player was a free agent at the end of his respective team's 2021 season.

==== Departures ====
Position	Player	Date	Notes
DE	Chris Slayton	May 23, 2022	Waived
RB	Frank Gore	June 3, 2022	Retired
C	Alex Mack	June 3, 2022	Retired
DE	Dee Ford	July 27, 2022	Released
WR	Taysir Mack	August 5, 2022	Waived
S	Leon O'Neal Jr.	August 10, 2022	Waived
CB	Darqueze Dennard	August 15, 2022	Released
FB	Josh Hokit	August 15, 2022	Waived
WR	KeeSean Johnson	August 15, 2022	Waived
DT	Tomasi Laulile	August 15, 2022	Waived
DE	Robert Nkemdiche	August 16, 2022	Released
LB	Jeremiah Gemmel	August 23, 2022	Waived
TE	Tanner Hudson	August 23, 2022	Released
CB	Ka'dar Hollman	August 28, 2022	Waived
CB	Ken Crawley	August 29, 2022	Released
C	Dohnovan West	August 29, 2022	Waived
TE	Troy Fumagalli	August 30, 2022	Released
S	Tashaun Gipson	August 30, 2022	Released
CB	Dontae Johnson	August 30, 2022	Released
WR	Marcus Johnson	August 30, 2022	Released
TE	Tyler Kroft	August 30, 2022	Released
OT	Jordan Mills	August 30, 2022	Released
WR	Willie Snead	August 30, 2022	Released
DT	Akeem Spence	August 30, 2022	Released
QB	Nate Sudfeld	August 30, 2022	Released
DE	Kemoko Turay	August 30, 2022	Released
WR	Malik Turner	August 30, 2022	Released
DE	Jordan Willis	August 30, 2022	Released
DT	Kevin Atkins	August 30, 2022	Waived
DE	Alex Barrett	August 30, 2022	Waived
CB	Tariq Castro-Fields	August 30, 2022	Waived
OT	Alfredo Gutiérrez	August 30, 2022	Waived
RB	JaMycal Hasty	August 30, 2022	Waived
S	Tayler Hawkins	August 30, 2022	Waived
CB	Qwuantrezz Knight	August 30, 2022	Waived
WR	Tay Martin	August 30, 2022	Waived
LB	Marcelino McCrary-Ball	August 30, 2022	Waived
LB	Segun Olubi	August 30, 2022	Waived
OG	Jason Poe	August 30, 2022	Waived
OT	Justin Skule	August 30, 2022	Waived
OG	Keaton Sutherland	August 30, 2022	Waived
RB	Trey Sermon	August 31, 2022	Waived
RB	Tevin Coleman	October 25, 2022	Released

== Draft ==
2022 San Francisco 49ers Draft
Round	Selection	Player	Position	College	Notes
1	29	Traded to the Miami Dolphins (Note: The 49ers traded first- and third-round selections (29th and 102nd overall), as well as 2021 and 2023 first-round selections to the Miami Dolphins in exchange for a 2021 first-round selection.)			
2	61	Drake Jackson	DE	USC	
3	93	Tyrion Davis-Price	RB	LSU	
3	102	Traded to the Miami Dolphins			2020 Resolution JC-2A selection (Note: The 49ers received a third-round selection along with 2021 and 2023 third-round selections when the New York Jets hired 49ers defensive coordinator Robert Saleh as head coach and the Washington Commanders hired 49ers vice president of player personnel Martin Mayhew as general manager.)
3	105	Danny Gray	WR	SMU	2020 Resolution JC-2A selection (Note: The 49ers received third-round selections in 2022 and 2023 when the Miami Dolphins hired 49ers offensive coordinator Mike McDaniel as head coach.)
4	134	Spencer Burford	OT	UTSA	
5	172	Samuel Womack	CB	Toledo	
6	187	Nick Zakelj	OT	Fordham	From Broncos (Note: The 49ers traded LB Jonas Griffith and a seventh-round selection (250th overall) to the Denver Broncos in exchange for a sixth-round selection (187th overall) and a 2023 seventh-round selection.)
6	207	Traded to the New York Jets (Note: The 49ers traded a sixth-round selection (207th overall) to the New York Jets in exchange for LB Jordan Willis and a 2021 seventh-round selection.)			
6	220	Kalia Davis	DT	UCF	Compensatory pick
6	221	Tariq Castro-Fields	CB	Penn State	Compensatory pick
7	250	Traded to the Denver Broncos			
7	262	Brock Purdy	QB	Iowa State	Compensatory pick

Draft trades

2022 San Francisco 49ers undrafted free agents
Name	Position	College	Ref.
Kevin Atkins	TE	Fresno State	
Jeremiah Gemmel	FB	North Carolina	
Tayler Hawkins	S	San Diego State	
Qwuantrezz Knight	CB	UCLA	
Taysir Mack	WR	Pittsburgh	
Tay Martin	WR	Oklahoma State	
Jordan Mason	RB	Georgia Tech	
Marcelino McCrary-Ball	LB	Indiana	
Segun Olubi	LB	San Diego State	
Leon O'Neal Jr.	S	Texas A&M	
Jason Poe	G, FB	Mercer	
Sam Schlueter	OT	Minnesota	
Garrett Walston	TE	North Carolina	
Dohnovan West	C	Arizona State	

== Personnel ==
=== Staff / Coaches ===
2022 San Francisco 49ers staff
Front office: Co-chairmen – John and Denise DeBartolo York; Chief executive officer – Jed York; President – Al Guido; Chief administrative officer and general counsel – Hanna Gordon; General manager – John Lynch; Assistant general manager – Adam Peters; Executive vice president of football operations – Paraag Marathe; Vice president and senior advisor – Keena Turner; Director of player personnel – Ran Carthon; Director of pro personnel – R. J. Gillen; Director of college scouting – Tariq Ahmad; Assistant director of college scouting – Justin Chabot; Vice president of football administration – Brian Hampton; Head coaches: Head coach – Kyle Shanahan; Assistant head coach/running backs – Anthony Lynn; Offensive coaches: Offensive passing game coordinator – Bobby Slowik; Quarterbacks – Brian Griese; Assistant quarterbacks – Klay Kubiak; Wide receivers – Leonard Hankerson; Tight ends – Brian Fleury; Offensive line/run game coordinator – Chris Foerster; Assistant offensive line – James Cregg; Assistant offensive line – Joe Graves; Offensive quality control – Asauni Rufus; Offensive quality control – Deuce Schwartz	Defensive coaches: Defensive coordinator – DeMeco Ryans; Defensive line – Kris Kocurek; Assistant defensive line – Darryl Tapp; Linebackers – Johnny Holland; Defensive pass game specialist/secondary – Cory Undlin; Safeties – Daniel Bullocks; Defensive assistant – Nick Sorensen; Defensive quality control – Stephen Adegoke; Defensive quality control – Andrew Hayes-Stoker; Special teams coaches: Special teams coordinator – Brian Schneider; Assistant special teams – Matthew Harper; Special teams quality control/game management specialist – August Mangin; Strength and conditioning: Head strength and conditioning – Dustin Perry; Assistant strength and conditioning – Aaron Hill; Assistant strength and conditioning – Mike Nicolini; Director, performance monitoring/assistant strength and conditioning – Shea Thompson

=== Final roster ===
2022 San Francisco 49ers roster
Quarterbacks (QB): 10 Jimmy Garoppolo; 17 Josh Johnson; 13 Brock Purdy; Running backs (RB): 32 Tyrion Davis-Price; 44 Kyle Juszczyk FB; 24 Jordan Mason; 23 Christian McCaffrey; 25 Elijah Mitchell; Wide receivers (WR): 11 Brandon Aiyuk; 6 Danny Gray; 15 Jauan Jennings; 3 Ray-Ray McCloud; 19 Deebo Samuel; Tight ends (TE): 82 Ross Dwelley; 85 George Kittle; 81 Tyler Kroft; 89 Charlie Woerner	Offensive linemen (OL): 65 Aaron Banks G; 64 Jake Brendel C; 60 Daniel Brunskill C; 74 Spencer Burford G; 69 Mike McGlinchey T; 68 Colton McKivitz T; 76 Jaylon Moore T; 71 Trent Williams T; 63 Nick Zakelj G; Defensive linemen (DL): 91 Arik Armstead DE; 97 Nick Bosa DE; 56 Samson Ebukam DE; 90 Kevin Givens DT; 92 Kerry Hyder DE; 95 Drake Jackson DE; 99 Javon Kinlaw DT; 96 T. Y. McGill DT; 94 Charles Omenihu DE; 75 Jordan Willis DE	Linebackers (LB): 51 Azeez Al-Shaair OLB; 48 Oren Burks MLB; 45 Demetrius Flannigan-Fowles OLB; 57 Dre Greenlaw OLB; 54 Fred Warner MLB; Defensive backs (DB): 31 Tashaun Gipson FS; 29 Talanoa Hufanga SS; 38 Deommodore Lenoir CB; 33 Tarvarius Moore SS; 30 George Odum SS; 20 Ambry Thomas CB; 7 Charvarius Ward CB; 1 Jimmie Ward FS; 26 Samuel Womack CB; Special teams (ST): 9 Robbie Gould K; 46 Taybor Pepper LS; 18 Mitch Wishnowsky P	Practice squad: 58 Alex Barrett DE; 28 Tevin Coleman RB; 50 Michael Dwumfour DT; 77 Alfredo Gutiérrez T (IPP); 41 Tayler Hawkins SS; 67 Keith Ismael C; 22 Janoris Jenkins CB; 27 Dontae Johnson CB (PS/I); 43 Qwuantrezz Knight CB; 86 Tay Martin WR; 40 Marcelino McCrary-Ball MLB; 84 Dazz Newsome WR; 62 Jason Poe G; 59 Curtis Robinson OLB; 83 Willie Snead WR; 55 Akeem Spence DT; 53 Kemoko Turay DE; 78 Leroy Watson T; Reserve: 93 Kalia Davis DT (NF-Inj.); -- Maurice Hurst Jr. DT (IR); 5 Trey Lance QB (IR); 88 Jordan Matthews TE (IR); 4 Emmanuel Moseley CB (IR); -- A. J. Parker SS (Futures); 98 Hassan Ridgeway DT (IR); 2 Jason Verrett CB (IR); Rookies in italics 53 active, 8 reserve, 16 practice squad (2 exempt)

=== Team captains ===
- Nick Bosa (DE)
- Arik Armstead (DT)
- Fred Warner (MLB)
- Jimmie Ward (DB)
- George Kittle (TE)
- Trent Williams (T)

== Preseason ==
Here are the 49ers preseason opponents and schedule.

Week	Date	Opponent	Result	Record	Venue	Recap
1	August 12	Green Bay Packers	W 28–21	1–0	Levi's Stadium	Recap
2	August 20	at Minnesota Vikings	W 17–7	2–0	U.S. Bank Stadium	Recap
3	August 25	at Houston Texans	L 0–17	2–1	NRG Stadium	Recap

== Regular season ==
=== Schedule ===
On May 4, the NFL announced that the 49ers would play the Arizona Cardinals during Week 11 on November 21 at Estadio Azteca in Mexico City, as part of the league's International Series. The game kicked off at 6:15 p.m. MST/5:15 p.m. PST, and was televised on ESPN, with the Cardinals serving as the home team.

The remainder of the 49ers' 2022 schedule was announced on May 12.

Week	Date	Opponent	Result	Record	Venue	Recap
1	September 11	at Chicago Bears	**L** 10–19	0–1	Soldier Field	Recap
2	September 18	**Seattle Seahawks**	**W** 27–7	1–1	Levi's Stadium	Recap
3	September 25	at Denver Broncos	**L** 10–11	1–2	Empower Field at Mile High	Recap
4	October 3	**Los Angeles Rams**	**W** 24–9	2–2	Levi's Stadium	Recap
5	October 9	at Carolina Panthers	**W** 37–15	3–2	Bank of America Stadium	Recap
6	October 16	at Atlanta Falcons	**L** 14–28	3–3	Mercedes-Benz Stadium	Recap
7	October 23	Kansas City Chiefs	**L** 23–44	3–4	Levi's Stadium	Recap
8	October 30	at **Los Angeles Rams**	**W** 31–14	4–4	SoFi Stadium	Recap
9	Bye					
10	November 13	Los Angeles Chargers	**W** 22–16	5–4	Levi's Stadium	Recap
11	November 21	at **Arizona Cardinals**	**W** 38–10	6–4	Estadio Azteca (Mexico City)	Recap
12	November 27	New Orleans Saints	**W** 13–0	7–4	Levi's Stadium	Recap
13	December 4	Miami Dolphins	**W** 33–17	8–4	Levi's Stadium	Recap
14	December 11	Tampa Bay Buccaneers	**W** 35–7	9–4	Levi's Stadium	Recap
15	December 15	at **Seattle Seahawks**	**W** 21–13	10–4	Lumen Field	Recap
16	December 24	Washington Commanders	**W** 37–20	11–4	Levi's Stadium	Recap
17	January 1, 2023	at Las Vegas Raiders	**W** 37–34 (OT)	12–4	Allegiant Stadium	Recap
18	January 8, 2023	**Arizona Cardinals**	**W** 38–13	13–4	Levi's Stadium	Recap
Note: Intra-division opponents are in **bold** text.

=== Game summaries ===
==== Week 1: at Chicago Bears ====
Week 1: San Francisco 49ers at Chicago Bears – Game summary

Quarter	1	2	3	4	Total
49ers	0	7	3	0	**10**
**Bears**	0	0	7	12	**19**

at Soldier Field, Chicago, Illinois

- Date: September 11
- Game time: 12:00 p.m. CDT/10:00 a.m. PDT
- Game weather: Cloudy, rain, 69 °F (21 °C)
- Game attendance: 62,159
- Referee: Clay Martin
- TV announcers (Fox): Joe Davis, Daryl Johnston and Pam Oliver
- Recap, Game Book

Game information

**First quarter**

- No scoring plays.

**Second quarter**

- SF – Deebo Samuel 6-yard run (Robbie Gould kick), 10:11. 49ers 7–0. **Drive: 7 plays, 52 yards, 3:32.**

**Third quarter**

- SF – Robbie Gould 25-yard field goal, 8:22. 49ers 10–0. **Drive: 11 plays, 68 yards, 6:38.**
- CHI – Dante Pettis 51-yard pass from Justin Fields (Cairo Santos kick), 5:32. 49ers 10–7. **Drive: 5 plays, 72 yards, 2:50.**

**Fourth quarter**

- CHI – Equanimeous St. Brown 18-yard pass from Justin Fields (kick failed, wide right), 12:45. Bears 13–10. **Drive: 10 plays, 84 yards, 3:52.**
- CHI – Khalil Herbert 3-yard run (kick failed, wide left), 7:21. Bears 19–10. **Drive: 5 plays, 21 yards, 2:21.**

**Top passers**

- SF – Trey Lance – 13/28, 164 yards, INT
- CHI – Justin Fields – 8/17, 121 yards, 2 TD, INT

**Top rushers**

- SF – Trey Lance – 13 rushes, 54 yards
- CHI – Khalil Herbert – 9 rushes, 45 yards, TD

**Top receivers**

- SF – Jauan Jennings – 4 receptions, 62 yards
- CHI – Dante Pettis – 1 reception, 51 yards, TD

==== Week 2: vs. Seattle Seahawks ====
Week 2: Seattle Seahawks at San Francisco 49ers – Game summary

Quarter	1	2	3	4	Total
Seahawks	0	0	7	0	**7**
**49ers**	6	14	0	7	**27**

at Levi's Stadium, Santa Clara, California

- Date: September 18
- Game time: 1:05 p.m. PDT
- Game weather: 63 °F (17 °C)
- Game attendance: 71,597
- Referee: Brad Rogers
- TV announcers (Fox): Adam Amin, Mark Schlereth and Kristina Pink
- Recap, Game Book

Game information

**First quarter**

- SF – Robbie Gould 20-yard field goal, 9:16. 49ers 3–0. **Drive: 11 plays, 73 yards, 5:44.**
- SF – Robbie Gould 33-yard field goal, 1:26. 49ers 6–0. **Drive: 7 plays, 74 yards, 4:27.**

**Second quarter**

- SF – Ross Dwelley 38-yard pass from Jimmy Garoppolo (Robbie Gould kick), 11:19. 49ers 13–0. **Drive: 4 plays, 78 yards, 2:16.**
- SF – Kyle Juszczyk 1-yard run (Robbie Gould kick), 1:26. 49ers 20–0. **Drive: 4 plays, 22 yards, 0:21.**

**Third quarter**

- SEA – Mike Jackson Sr. 85-yard blocked field goal return (Jason Myers kick), 5:25. 49ers 20–7.

**Fourth quarter**

- SF – Jimmy Garoppolo 1-yard run (Robbie Gould kick), 1:51. 49ers 27–7. **Drive: 13 plays, 63 yards, 7:09.**

**Top passers**

- SEA – Geno Smith – 24/30, 198 yards, INT
- SF – Jimmy Garoppolo – 13/21, 154 yards, TD

**Top rushers**

- SEA – Rashaad Penny – 6 rushes, 15 yards
- SF – Jeff Wilson Jr. – 18 rushes, 84 yards

**Top receivers**

- SEA – Tyler Lockett – 9 receptions, 107 yards
- SF – Brandon Aiyuk – 5 receptions, 63 yards

==== Week 3: at Denver Broncos ====
Week 3: San Francisco 49ers at Denver Broncos – Game summary

Quarter	1	2	3	4	Total
49ers	7	0	0	3	**10**
**Broncos**	0	3	2	6	**11**

at Empower Field at Mile High, Denver, Colorado

- Date: September 25
- Game time: 6:20 p.m. MDT/5:20 p.m. PDT
- Game weather: Clear, 73 °F (23 °C)
- Game attendance: 77,021
- Referee: Shawn Hochuli
- TV announcers (NBC): Mike Tirico, Cris Collinsworth and Melissa Stark
- Recap, Game Book

Game information

**First quarter**

- SF – Brandon Aiyuk 3-yard pass from Jimmy Garoppolo (Robbie Gould kick), 7:56. 49ers 7–0. **Drive: 6 plays, 75 yards, 3:11.**

**Second quarter**

- DEN – Brandon McManus 55-yard field goal, 11:56. 49ers 7–3. **Drive: 8 plays, 57 yards, 3:11.**

**Third quarter**

- DEN – Jimmy Garoppolo stepped out of back of endzone for safety, 9:53. **49ers 7–5.**

**Fourth quarter**

- SF – Robbie Gould 51-yard field goal, 14:56. 49ers 10–5. **Drive: 4 plays, 8 yards, 1:19.**
- DEN – Melvin Gordon 1-yard run (two-point pass failed), 4:10. Broncos 11–10. **Drive: 12 plays, 80 yards, 6:04.**

**Top passers**

- SF – Jimmy Garoppolo – 18/29, 211 yards, TD, INT
- DEN – Russell Wilson – 20/33, 184 yards

**Top rushers**

- SF – Jeff Wilson Jr. – 12 rushes, 75 yards
- DEN – Javonte Williams – 15 rushes, 58 yards

**Top receivers**

- SF – Deebo Samuel – 5 receptions, 73 yards
- DEN – Courtland Sutton – 8 receptions, 97 yards

==== Week 4: vs. Los Angeles Rams ====
Week 4: Los Angeles Rams at San Francisco 49ers – Game summary

Quarter	1	2	3	4	Total
Rams	3	3	3	0	**9**
**49ers**	7	7	0	10	**24**

at Levi's Stadium, Santa Clara, California

- Date: October 3
- Game time: 5:15 p.m. PDT
- Game weather: Clear, 73 °F (23 °C)
- Game attendance: 71,597
- Referee: Brad Allen
- TV announcers (KGO-TV/ESPN): Joe Buck, Troy Aikman and Lisa Salters
- Recap, Game Book

Game information

**First quarter**

- LAR – Matt Gay 39-yard field goal, 6:48. Rams 3–0. **Drive: 14 plays, 54 yards, 8:12.**
- SF – Jeff Wilson Jr. 32-yard run (Robbie Gould kick), 2:46. 49ers 7–3. **Drive: 8 plays, 75 yards, 4:02.**

**Second quarter**

- LAR – Matt Gay 29-yard field goal, 6:26. 49ers 7–6. **Drive: 10 plays, 54 yards, 5:08.**
- SF – Deebo Samuel 57-yard pass from Jimmy Garoppolo (Robbie Gould kick), 3:01. 49ers 14–6. **Drive: 6 plays, 75 yards, 3:36.**

**Third quarter**

- LAR – Matt Gay 26-yard field goal, 4:28. 49ers 14–9. **Drive: 16 plays, 75 yards, 7:43.**

**Fourth quarter**

- SF – Robbie Gould 25-yard field goal, 14:54. 49ers 17–9. **Drive: 9 plays, 67 yards, 4:32.**
- SF – Talanoa Hufanga 52-yard interception return (Robbie Gould kick), 6:27. 49ers 24–9.

**Top passers**

- LAR – Matthew Stafford – 32/48, 254 yards, INT
- SF – Jimmy Garoppolo – 16/27, 239 yards, TD

**Top rushers**

- LAR – Darrell Henderson Jr. – 7 rushes, 27 yards
- SF – Jeff Wilson Jr. – 18 rushes, 74 yards, TD

**Top receivers**

- LAR – Cooper Kupp – 14 receptions, 122 yards
- SF – Deebo Samuel – 6 receptions, 115 yards, TD

==== Week 5: at Carolina Panthers ====
Week 5: San Francisco 49ers at Carolina Panthers – Game summary

Quarter	1	2	3	4	Total
**49ers**	7	10	7	13	**37**
Panthers	0	3	9	3	**15**

at Bank of America Stadium, Charlotte, North Carolina

- Date: October 9
- Game time: 4:05 p.m. EDT/1:05 p.m. PDT
- Game weather: Sunny, 68 °F (20 °C)
- Game attendance: 72,321
- Referee: Shawn Smith
- TV announcers (CBS): Ian Eagle, Charles Davis and Evan Washburn
- Recap, Game Book

Game information

**First quarter**

- SF – Tevin Coleman 9-yard pass from Jimmy Garoppolo (Robbie Gould kick), 11:40. 49ers 7–0. **Drive: 7 plays, 75 yards, 3:20.**

**Second quarter**

- SF – Robbie Gould 49-yard field goal, 12:56. 49ers 10–0. **Drive: 8 plays, 38 yards, 4:14.**
- CAR – Eddy Pineiro 43-yard field goal, 7:59. 49ers 10–3. **Drive: 9 plays, 53 yards, 4:27.**
- SF – Emmanuel Moseley 41-yard interception return (Robbie Gould kick), 0:43. 49ers 17–3.

**Third quarter**

- CAR – Christian McCaffrey 19-yard run (run failed), 11:57. 49ers 17–9. **Drive: 7 plays, 51 yards, 3:03.**
- SF – Deebo Samuel 4-yard pass from Jimmy Garoppolo (Robbie Gould kick), 6:32. 49ers 24–9. **Drive: 10 plays, 75 yards, 5:25.**
- CAR – Eddy Pineiro 37-yard field goal, 3:40. 49ers 24–12. **Drive: 6 plays, 31 yards, 2:52.**

**Fourth quarter**

- SF – Jeff Wilson Jr. 1-yard run (kick failed), 12:31. 49ers 30–12. **Drive: 12 plays, 75 yards, 6:09.**
- CAR – Eddy Pineiro 34-yard field goal, 6:51. 49ers 30–15. **Drive: 12 plays, 59 yards, 5:40.**
- SF – Tevin Coleman 5-yard run (Mitch Wishnowsky kick), 3:15. 49ers 37–15. **Drive: 2 plays, 3 yards, 0:51.**

**Top passers**

- SF – Jimmy Garoppolo – 18/30, 253 yards, 2 TD
- CAR – Baker Mayfield – 20/36, 215 yards, INT

**Top rushers**

- SF – Jeff Wilson Jr. – 17 rushes, 120 yards, TD
- CAR – Christian McCaffrey – 14 rushes, 54 yards, TD

**Top receivers**

- SF – Brandon Aiyuk – 3 receptions, 58 yards
- CAR – Shi Smith – 4 receptions, 69 yards

==== Week 6: at Atlanta Falcons ====
Week 6: San Francisco 49ers at Atlanta Falcons – Game summary

Quarter	1	2	3	4	Total
49ers	0	14	0	0	**14**
**Falcons**	14	7	7	0	**28**

at Mercedes-Benz Stadium, Atlanta, Georgia

- Date: October 16
- Game time: 1:00 p.m. EDT/10:00 a.m. PDT
- Game weather: Sunny, 77 °F (25 °C) (retractable roof open)
- Game attendance: 69,813
- Referee: Carl Cheffers
- TV announcers (Fox): Noah Eagle, Mark Schlereth and Kristina Pink
- Recap, Game Book

Game information

**First quarter**

- ATL – MyCole Pruitt 2-yard pass from Marcus Mariota (Younghoe Koo kick), 8:46. Falcons 7–0. **Drive: 11 plays, 74 yards, 6:14.**
- ATL – Jaylinn Hawkins fumble recovery in endzone (Younghoe Koo kick), 1:26. Falcons 14–0.

**Second quarter**

- SF – Brandon Aiyuk 12-yard pass from Jimmy Garoppolo (Robbie Gould kick), 11:34. Falcons 14–7. **Drive: 8 plays, 79 yards, 4:52.**
- SF – Brandon Aiyuk 14-yard pass from Jimmy Garoppolo (Robbie Gould kick), 7:07. Tied 14–14. **Drive: 4 plays, 32 yards, 2:09.**
- ATL – Marcus Mariota 3-yard run (Younghoe Koo kick), 0:57. Falcons 21–14. **Drive: 11 plays, 75 yards, 6:10.**

**Third quarter**

- ATL – Kyle Pitts 7-yard pass from Marcus Mariota (Younghoe Koo kick), 8:40. Falcons 28–14. **Drive: 9 plays, 65 yards, 5:12.**

**Fourth quarter**

- No scoring plays.

**Top passers**

- SF – Jimmy Garoppolo – 29/41, 296 yards, 2 TD, 2 INT
- ATL – Marcus Mariota – 13/14, 129 yards, 2 TD

**Top rushers**

- SF – Jeff Wilson Jr. – 7 rushes, 25 yards
- ATL – Caleb Huntley – 16 rushes, 59 yards

**Top receivers**

- SF – Brandon Aiyuk – 8 receptions, 83 yards, 2 TD
- ATL – Olamide Zaccheaus – 4 receptions, 58 yards

==== Week 7: vs. Kansas City Chiefs ====
Week 7: Kansas City Chiefs at San Francisco 49ers – Game summary

Quarter	1	2	3	4	Total
**Chiefs**	7	7	14	16	**44**
49ers	10	3	3	7	**23**

at Levi's Stadium, Santa Clara, California

- Date: October 23
- Game time: 1:25 p.m. PDT
- Game weather: Sunny, 64 °F (18 °C)
- Game attendance: 71,746
- Referee: Alex Kemp
- TV announcers (Fox): Kevin Burkhardt, Greg Olsen, Erin Andrews and Tom Rinaldi
- Recap, Game Book

Game information

**First quarter**

- SF – Robbie Gould 30-yard field goal, 10:22. 49ers 3–0. **Drive: 10 plays, 63 yards, 4:38.**
- SF – Ray-Ray McCloud 8-yard pass from Jimmy Garoppolo (Robbie Gould kick), 6:29. 49ers 10–0. **Drive: 4 plays, 34 yards, 2:14.**
- KC – Mecole Hardman 8-yard pass from Patrick Mahomes (Harrison Butker kick), 2:07. 49ers 10–7. **Drive: 9 plays, 73 yards, 4:22.**

**Second quarter**

- SF – Robbie Gould 50-yard field goal, 12:11. 49ers 13–7. **Drive: 10 plays, 46 yards, 4:56.**
- KC – Mecole Hardman 25-yard run (Harrison Butker kick), 7:09. Chiefs 14–13. **Drive: 10 plays, 90 yards, 5:02.**

**Third quarter**

- KC – Clyde Edwards-Helaire 16-yard run (Harrison Butker kick), 13:28. Chiefs 21–13. **Drive: 3 plays, 33 yards, 1:12.**
- SF – Robbie Gould 49-yard field goal, 7:41. Chiefs 21–16. **Drive: 11 plays, 52 yards, 5:47.**
- KC – Justin Watson 4-yard pass from Patrick Mahomes (Harrison Butker kick), 3:31. Chiefs 28–16. **Drive: 9 plays, 75 yards, 4:10.**

**Fourth quarter**

- SF – George Kittle 15-yard pass from Jimmy Garoppolo (Robbie Gould kick), 14:16. Chiefs 28–23. **Drive: 8 plays, 75 yards, 4:15.**
- KC – Mecole Hardman 3-yard run (Harrison Butker kick), 10:43. Chiefs 35–23. **Drive: 6 plays, 80 yards, 3:33.**
- KC – Frank Clark sacks Jimmy Garoppolo in endzone for a safety, 8:49. Chiefs 37–23.
- KC – JuJu Smith-Schuster 45-yard pass from Patrick Mahomes (Harrison Butker kick), 6:05. Chiefs 44–23. **Drive: 5 plays, 72 yards, 2:44.**

**Top passers**

- KC – Patrick Mahomes – 25/34, 423 yards, 3 TD, INT
- SF – Jimmy Garoppolo – 25/37, 303 yards, 2 TD, INT

**Top rushers**

- KC – Isiah Pacheco – 8 rushes, 43 yards
- SF – Jeff Wilson Jr. – 7 rushes, 54 yards

**Top receivers**

- KC – JuJu Smith-Schuster – 7 receptions, 124 yards, TD
- SF – George Kittle – 6 receptions, 98 yards, TD

==== Week 8: at Los Angeles Rams ====
Week 8: San Francisco 49ers at Los Angeles Rams – Game summary

Quarter	1	2	3	4	Total
**49ers**	0	10	7	14	**31**
Rams	7	7	0	0	**14**

at SoFi Stadium, Inglewood, California

- Date: October 30
- Game time: 1:25 p.m. PDT
- Game weather: Sunny, 75 °F (24 °C)
- Game attendance: 73,505
- Referee: John Hussey
- TV announcers (Fox): Kevin Burkhardt, Greg Olsen, Erin Andrews and Tom Rinaldi
- Recap, Game Book

Game information

**First quarter**

- LAR – Matthew Stafford 1-yard run (Matt Gay kick), 0:09. Rams 7–0. **Drive: 17 plays, 88 yards, 9:21.**

**Second quarter**

- SF – Brandon Aiyuk 34-yard pass from Christian McCaffrey (Robbie Gould kick), 12:10. Tied 7–7. **Drive: 6 plays, 71 yards, 2:59.**
- LAR – Cooper Kupp 16-yard pass from Matthew Stafford (Matt Gay kick), 6:35. Rams 14–7. **Drive: 9 plays, 75 yards, 5:35.**
- SF – Robbie Gould 39-yard field goal, 1:00. Rams 14–10. **Drive: 11 plays, 52 yards, 5:35.**

**Third quarter**

- SF – Christian McCaffrey 9-yard pass from Jimmy Garoppolo (Robbie Gould kick), 1:51. 49ers 17–14. **Drive: 11 plays, 88 yards, 6:54.**

**Fourth quarter**

- SF – Christian McCaffrey 1-yard run (Robbie Gould kick), 12:07. 49ers 24–14. **Drive: 6 plays, 58 yards, 3:08.**
- SF – George Kittle 7-yard pass from Jimmy Garoppolo (Robbie Gould kick), 6:41. 49ers 31–14. **Drive: 5 plays, 73 yards, 3:06.**

**Top passers**

- SF – Jimmy Garoppolo – 21/25, 235 yards, 2 TD
- LAR – Matthew Stafford – 22/33, 187 yards, TD

**Top rushers**

- SF – Christian McCaffrey – 18 rushes, 94 yards, TD
- LAR – Ronnie Rivers – 8 rushes, 21 yards

**Top receivers**

- SF – Brandon Aiyuk – 6 receptions, 81 yards, TD
- LAR – Cooper Kupp – 8 receptions, 79 yards, TD

==== Week 10: vs. Los Angeles Chargers ====
Week 10: Los Angeles Chargers at San Francisco 49ers – Game summary

Quarter	1	2	3	4	Total
Chargers	7	9	0	0	**16**
**49ers**	3	7	3	9	**22**

at Levi's Stadium, Santa Clara, California

- Date: November 13
- Game time: 5:20 p.m. PST
- Game weather: Clear, 58 °F (14 °C)
- Game attendance: 71,709
- Referee: Shawn Smith
- TV announcers (NBC): Mike Tirico, Cris Collinsworth and Melissa Stark
- Recap, Game Book

Game information

**First quarter**

- LAC – DeAndre Carter 32-yard pass from Justin Herbert (Cameron Dicker kick), 11:35. Chargers 7–0. **Drive: 7 plays, 75 yards, 3:25.**
- SF – Robbie Gould 20-yard field goal, 4:10. Chargers 7–3. **Drive: 14 plays, 67 yards, 7:25.**

**Second quarter**

- LAC – Cameron Dicker 47-yard field goal, 14:52. Chargers 10–3. **Drive: 4 plays, 3 yards, 0:42.**
- LAC – Cameron Dicker 25-yard field goal, 6:25. Chargers 13–3. **Drive: 9 plays, 39 yards, 3:43.**
- SF – Jimmy Garoppolo 1-yard run (Robbie Gould kick), 1:57. Chargers 13–10. **Drive: 9 plays, 75 yards, 4:45.**
- LAC – Cameron Dicker 40-yard field goal, 0:00. Chargers 16–10. **Drive: 11 plays, 54 yards, 1:57.**

**Third quarter**

- SF – Robbie Gould 26-yard field goal, 8:02. Chargers 16–13. **Drive: 12 plays, 67 yards, 6:08.**

**Fourth quarter**

- SF – Christian McCaffrey 2-yard run, (kick failed) 7:54. 49ers 19–16. **Drive: 14 plays, 74 yards, 6:59.**
- SF – Robbie Gould 20-yard field goal, 0:58. 49ers 22–16. **Drive: 4 plays, 6 yards, 0:19.**

**Top passers**

- LAC – Justin Herbert – 21/35, 196 yards, TD, INT
- SF – Jimmy Garoppolo – 19/28, 240 yards

**Top rushers**

- LAC – Austin Ekeler – 6 rushes, 24 yards
- SF – Elijah Mitchell – 18 rushes, 89 yards

**Top receivers**

- LAC – DeAndre Carter – 4 receptions, 64 yards, TD
- SF – Brandon Aiyuk – 6 receptions, 84 yards

==== Week 11: at Arizona Cardinals ====
NFL Mexico City games

Week 11: San Francisco 49ers at Arizona Cardinals – Game summary

Quarter	1	2	3	4	Total
**49ers**	0	17	14	7	**38**
Cardinals	3	7	0	0	**10**

at Estadio Azteca, Mexico City, Mexico

- Date: November 21
- Game time: 6:15 p.m. MST/5:15 p.m. PST
- Game weather: Rain, 60 °F (16 °C)
- Game attendance: 78,427
- Referee: Craig Wrolstad
- TV announcers (KGO-TV/ESPN): Joe Buck, Troy Aikman and Lisa Salters
- Recap, Game Book

Game information

**First quarter**

- ARI – Matt Prater 40-yard field goal, 8:00. Cardinals 3–0. **Drive: 11 plays, 58 yards, 4:38.**

**Second quarter**

- SF – Brandon Aiyuk 7-yard pass from Jimmy Garoppolo (Robbie Gould kick), 13:35. 49ers 7–3. **Drive: 9 plays, 82 yards, 4:06.**
- SF – George Kittle 39-yard pass from Jimmy Garoppolo (Robbie Gould kick), 8:42. 49ers 14–3. **Drive: 3 plays, 46 yards, 0:55.**
- ARI – James Conner 2-yard run (Matt Prater kick), 4:19. 49ers 14–10. **Drive: 9 plays, 75 yards, 4:23.**
- SF – Robbie Gould 39-yard field goal, 0:43. 49ers 17–10. **Drive: 10 plays, 54 yards, 3:36.**

**Third quarter**

- SF – Deebo Samuel 39-yard run (Robbie Gould kick), 10:34. 49ers 24–10. **Drive: 8 plays, 75 yards, 4:26.**
- SF – Brandon Aiyuk 13-yard pass from Jimmy Garoppolo (Robbie Gould kick), 0:28. 49ers 31–10. **Drive: 6 plays, 47 yards, 3:57.**

**Fourth quarter**

- SF – George Kittle 32-yard pass from Jimmy Garoppolo (Robbie Gould kick), 10:08. 49ers 38–10. **Drive: 5 plays, 50 yards, 3:02.**

**Top passers**

- SF – Jimmy Garoppolo – 20/29, 228 yards, 4 TD
- ARI – Colt McCoy – 24/34, 218 yards, INT

**Top rushers**

- SF – Elijah Mitchell – 9 rushes, 59 yards
- ARI – James Conner – 14 rushes, 42 yards, TD

**Top receivers**

- SF – George Kittle – 4 receptions, 84 yards, 2 TD
- ARI – Greg Dortch – 9 receptions, 103 yards

==== Week 12: vs. New Orleans Saints ====
Week 12: New Orleans Saints at San Francisco 49ers – Game summary

Quarter	1	2	3	4	Total
Saints	0	0	0	0	**0**
**49ers**	3	7	3	0	**13**

at Levi's Stadium, Santa Clara, California

- Date: November 27
- Game time: 1:25 p.m. PST
- Game weather: Partly cloudy, 67 °F (19 °C)
- Game attendance: 71,275
- Referee: Shawn Hochuli
- TV announcers (Fox): Kevin Kugler, Mark Sanchez and Laura Okmin
- Recap, Game Book

Game information

**First quarter**

- SF – Robbie Gould 24-yard field goal, 8:01. 49ers 3–0. **Drive: 11 plays, 38 yards, 4:54.**

**Second quarter**

- SF – Jauan Jennings 5-yard pass from Jimmy Garoppolo (Robbie Gould kick), 0:13. 49ers 10–0. **Drive: 9 plays, 57 yards, 1:34.**

**Third quarter**

- SF – Robbie Gould 46-yard field goal, 10:25. 49ers 13–0. **Drive: 9 plays, 47 yards, 4:35.**

**Fourth quarter**

- No scoring plays.

**Top passers**

- NO – Andy Dalton – 18/29, 209 yards
- SF – Jimmy Garoppolo – 26/37, 222 yards, TD

**Top rushers**

- NO – Andy Dalton – 4 rushes, 21 yards
- SF – Elijah Mitchell – 7 rushes, 35 yards

**Top receivers**

- NO – Chris Olave – 5 receptions, 62 yards
- SF – Brandon Aiyuk – 5 receptions, 65 yards

==== Week 13: vs. Miami Dolphins ====
Week 13: Miami Dolphins at San Francisco 49ers – Game summary

Quarter	1	2	3	4	Total
Dolphins	7	3	0	7	**17**
**49ers**	10	7	6	10	**33**

at Levi's Stadium, Santa Clara, California

- Date: December 4
- Game time: 1:05 p.m. PST
- Game weather: Cloudy, 58 °F (14 °C)
- Game attendance: 71,732
- Referee: Tra Blake
- TV announcers (Fox): Joe Davis, Daryl Johnston and Pam Oliver
- Recap, Game Book

Game information
- MIA – Trent Sherfield 75-yard pass from Tua Tagovailoa (Jason Sanders kick), 14:50. Dolphins 7–0. **Drive: 1 play, 75 yards, 0:10.**
- SF – Robbie Gould 47-yard field goal, 10:37. Dolphins 7–3. **Drive: 9 plays, 54 yards, 4:13.**
- SF – Kyle Juszczyk 3-yard pass from Brock Purdy (Robbie Gould kick), 4:52. 49ers 10–7. **Drive: 9 plays, 54 yards, 4:38.**

**Second quarter**

- MIA – Jason Sanders 43-yard field goal, 10:14. Tied 10–10. **Drive: 12 plays, 65 yards, 5:37.**
- SF – Christian McCaffrey 3-yard pass from Brock Purdy (Robbie Gould kick), 0:04. 49ers 17–10. **Drive: 11 plays, 76 yards, 2:44.**

**Third quarter**

- SF – Robbie Gould 43-yard field goal, 2:52. 49ers 20–10. **Drive: 12 plays, 39 yards, 7:09.**
- SF – Robbie Gould 36-yard field goal, 1:14. 49ers 23–10. **Drive: 4 plays, 7 yards, 1:31.**

**Fourth quarter**

- MIA – Tyreek Hill 45-yard pass from Tua Tagovailoa (Jason Sanders kick), 14:28. 49ers 23–17. **Drive: 10 plays, 34 yards, 3:57.**
- SF – Robbie Gould 48-yard field goal, 2:03. 49ers 26–17. **Drive: 10 plays, 34 yards, 3:57.**
- SF – Dre Greenlaw 23-yard fumble return (Robbie Gould kick), 1:53. 49ers 33–17.

**Top passers**

- MIA – Tua Tagovailoa – 18/33, 295 yards, 2 TD, 2 INT
- SF – Brock Purdy – 25/37, 210 yards, 2 TD, INT

**Top rushers**

- MIA – Raheem Mostert – 7 rushes, 30 yards
- SF – Christian McCaffrey – 17 rushes, 66 yards

**Top receivers**

- MIA – Tyreek Hill – 9 receptions, 146 yards, TD
- SF – Christian McCaffrey – 8 receptions, 80 yards, TD

==== Week 14: vs. Tampa Bay Buccaneers ====
Week 14: Tampa Bay Buccaneers at San Francisco 49ers – Game summary

Quarter	1	2	3	4	Total
Buccaneers	0	0	7	0	**7**
**49ers**	7	21	7	0	**35**

at Levi's Stadium, Santa Clara, California

- Date: December 11
- Game time: 1:25 p.m. PST
- Game weather: Cloudy, 54 °F (12 °C)
- Game attendance: 71,725
- Referee: Brad Allen
- TV announcers (Fox): Kevin Burkhardt, Greg Olsen and Erin Andrews
- Recap, Game Book

Game information

**First quarter**

- SF – Deebo Samuel 13-yard run (Robbie Gould kick), 12:26. 49ers 7–0. **Drive: 5 plays, 67 yards, 2:34.**

**Second quarter**

- SF – Brock Purdy 2-yard run (Robbie Gould kick), 14:55. 49ers 14–0. **Drive: 8 plays, 62 yards, 4:48.**
- SF – Christian McCaffrey 27-yard pass from Brock Purdy (Robbie Gould kick), 7:49. 49ers 21–0. **Drive: 9 plays, 71 yards, 5:21.**
- SF – Brandon Aiyuk 32-yard pass from Brock Purdy (Robbie Gould kick), 0:15. 49ers 28–0. **Drive: 7 plays, 91 yards, 2:14.**

**Third quarter**

- SF – Christian McCaffrey 38-yard run, 14:01. 49ers 35–0. **Drive: 2 plays, 38 yards, 0:12.**
- TB – Russell Gage 8-yard pass from Tom Brady (Ryan Succop kick), 2:48. 49ers 35–7. **Drive: 13 plays, 74 yards, 4:26.**

**Fourth quarter**

- No scoring plays

**Top passers**

- TB – Tom Brady – 34/55, 253 yards, TD, 2 INT
- SF – Brock Purdy – 16/21, 185 yards, 2 TD

**Top rushers**

- TB – Rachaad White – 13 rushes, 56 yards
- SF – Christian McCaffrey – 14 rushes, 119 yards, TD

**Top receivers**

- TB – Chris Godwin – 5 receptions, 54 yards
- SF – Brandon Aiyuk – 2 receptions, 57 yards, TD

==== Week 15: at Seattle Seahawks ====
Week 15: San Francisco 49ers at Seattle Seahawks – Game summary

Quarter	1	2	3	4	Total
**49ers**	7	7	7	0	**21**
Seahawks	0	3	3	7	**13**

at Lumen Field, Seattle, Washington

- Date: December 15
- Game time: 5:15 p.m. PST
- Game weather: Clear, 39 °F (4 °C)
- Game attendance: 68,957
- Referee: Alex Kemp
- TV announcers (KTVU/Prime Video): Al Michaels, Kirk Herbstreit and Kaylee Hartung
- Recap, Game Book

Game information

**First quarter**

- SF – George Kittle 28-yard pass from Brock Purdy (Robbie Gould kick), 3:49. 49ers 7–0. **Drive: 9 plays, 86 yards, 5:24.**

**Second quarter**

- SEA – Jason Myers 38-yard field goal, 4:47. 49ers 7–3. **Drive: 12 plays, 62 yards, 5:50.**
- SF – Christian McCaffrey 1-yard run (Robbie Gould kick), 0:47. 49ers 14–3. **Drive: 2 plays, 6 yards, 0:09.**

**Third quarter**

- SF – George Kittle 54-yard pass from Brock Purdy (Robbie Gould kick), 14:00. 49ers 21–3. **Drive: 2 plays, 59 yards, 1:00.**
- SEA – Jason Myers 51-yard field goal, 8:08. 49ers 21–6. **Drive: 10 plays, 42 yards, 5:52.**

**Fourth quarter**

- SEA – Noah Fant 10-yard pass from Geno Smith (Jason Myers kick), 3:35. 49ers 21–13. **Drive: 7 plays, 67 yards, 1:25.**

**Top passers**

- SF – Brock Purdy – 17/26, 217 yards, 2 TD
- SEA – Geno Smith – 31/44, 238 yards, TD

**Top rushers**

- SF – Christian McCaffrey – 26 rushes, 108 yards, TD
- SEA – Kenneth Walker III – 12 rushes, 47 yards

**Top receivers**

- SF – George Kittle – 4 receptions, 93 yards, 2 TD
- SEA – Tyler Lockett – 7 receptions, 68 yards

With the win, the 49ers improved to 10-4 and they clinched the NFC West for the first time since 2019.

==== Week 16: vs. Washington Commanders ====
Week 16: Washington Commanders at San Francisco 49ers – Game summary

Quarter	1	2	3	4	Total
Commanders	0	7	7	6	**20**
**49ers**	0	7	14	16	**37**

at Levi's Stadium, Santa Clara, California

- Date: December 24
- Game time: 1:05 p.m. PST
- Game weather: Hazy, 62 °F (17 °C)
- Game attendance: 71,642
- Referee: Jerome Boger
- TV announcers (CBS): Kevin Harlan, Trent Green, and Melanie Collins
- Recap, Game Book

Game information

**First quarter**

- No scoring plays.

**Second quarter**

- SF – Ray-Ray McCloud 71-yard run (Robbie Gould kick), 6:26. 49ers 7–0. **Drive: 7 plays, 99 yards, 3:06.**
- WAS – Jahan Dotson 7-yard pass from Taylor Heinicke (Joey Slye kick), 0:22. Tied 7–7. **Drive: 8 plays, 31 yards, 2:35.**

**Third quarter**

- SF – George Kittle 34-yard pass from Brock Purdy (Robbie Gould kick), 10:38. 49ers 14–7. **Drive: 7 plays, 76 yards, 4:42.**
- SF – George Kittle 33-yard pass from Brock Purdy (Robbie Gould kick), 4:52. 49ers 21–7. **Drive: 2 plays, 34 yards, 0:51.**
- WAS – Terry McLaurin 3-yard pass from Taylor Heinicke (Joey Slye kick), 2:46. 49ers 21–14. **Drive: 4 plays, 75 yards, 2:06.**

Fourth quarter'

- SF – Robbie Gould 26-yard field goal, 14:56. 49ers 24–14. **Drive: 5 plays, 52 yards, 2:50.**
- SF – Robbie Gould 23-yard field goal, 12:02. 49ers 27–14. **Drive: 4 plays, 6 yards, 2:02.**
- SF – Robbie Gould 35-yard field goal, 9:17. 49ers 30–14. **Drive: 4 plays, 8 yards, 1:54.**
- WAS – Curtis Samuel 20-yard pass from Carson Wentz (pass failed), 5:25. 49ers 30–20. **Drive: 11 plays, 82 yards, 3:51.**
- SF – Christian McCaffrey 1-yard run (Robbie Gould kick), 2:13. 49ers 37–20. **Drive: 8 plays, 33 yards, 3:12.**

**Top passers**

- WAS – Taylor Heinicke – 13/18, 166 yards, 2 TD, INT
- SF – Brock Purdy – 15/22, 234 yards, 2 TD, INT

**Top rushers**

- WAS – Brian Robinson Jr. – 22 rushes, 58 yards
- SF – Ray-Ray McCloud – 1 rush, 71 yards, TD

**Top receivers**

- WAS – Terry McLaurin – 4 receptions, 77 yards, TD
- SF – George Kittle – 6 receptions, 120 yards, 2 TD

==== Week 17: at Las Vegas Raiders ====
Week 17: San Francisco 49ers at Las Vegas Raiders – Game summary

Quarter	1	2	3	4	OT	Total
**49ers**	7	7	7	13	3	**37**
Raiders	10	7	7	10	0	**34**

at Allegiant Stadium, Paradise, Nevada

- Date: January 1
- Game time: 1:05 p.m. PST
- Game weather: None (indoor stadium)
- Game attendance: 62,367
- Referee: Clay Martin
- TV announcers (Fox): Kevin Kugler, Mark Sanchez and Laura Okmin
- Recap, Game Book

Game information

**First quarter**

- LV – Darren Waller 24-yard pass from Jarrett Stidham (Daniel Carlson kick), 11:40. Raiders 7–0. **Drive: 6 plays, 70 yards, 3:20.**
- SF – Brandon Aiyuk 2-yard pass from Brock Purdy (Robbie Gould kick), 7:06. Tied 7–7. **Drive: 8 plays, 67 yards, 4:34.**
- LV – Daniel Carlson 20-yard field goal, 1:45. Raiders 10–7. **Drive: 10 plays, 74 yards, 5:21.**

**Second quarter**

- SF – George Kittle 2-yard pass from Brock Purdy (Robbie Gould kick), 9:38. 49ers 14–10. **Drive: 13 plays, 75 yards, 7:07.**
- LV – Davante Adams 4-yard pass from Jarrett Stidham (Daniel Carlson kick), 0:10. Raiders 17–14. **Drive: 8 plays, 44 yards, 2:23.**

**Third quarter**

- LV – Davante Adams 60-yard pass from Jarrett Stidham (Daniel Carlson kick), 10:22. Raiders 24–14. **Drive: 6 plays, 84 yards, 2:54.**
- SF – Christian McCaffrey 14-yard run (Robbie Gould kick), 5:22. Raiders 24–21. **Drive: 8 plays, 75 yards, 5:00.**

**Fourth quarter**

- SF – Robbie Gould 43-yard field goal, 12:34. Tied 24–24. **Drive: 6 plays, 17 yards, 2:12.**
- SF – Robbie Gould 24-yard field goal, 6:44. 49ers 27–24. **Drive: 7 plays, 59 yards, 2:58.**
- LV – Daniel Carlson 57-yard field goal, 4:08. Tied 27–27. **Drive: 7 plays, 36 yards, 2:36.**
- SF – Jordan Mason 14-yard run (Robbie Gould kick), 2:17. 49ers 34–27. **Drive: 5 plays, 75 yards, 1:51.**
- LV – Josh Jacobs 1-yard run (Daniel Carlson kick), 1:11. Tied 34–34. **Drive: 3 plays, 75 yards, 1:06.**

**Overtime**

- SF – Robbie Gould 23-yard field goal, 6:53. Tied 37–34. **Drive: 2 plays, -2 yards, 0:46.**

**Top passers**

- SF – Brock Purdy – 22/35, 284 yards, 2 TD, INT
- LV – Jarrett Stidham – 23/34, 365 yards, 3 TD, 2 INT

**Top rushers**

- SF – Christian McCaffrey – 19 rushes, 121 yards, TD
- LV – Josh Jacobs – 17 rush, 69 yards, TD

**Top receivers**

- SF – Brandon Aiyuk – 9 receptions, 101 yards, TD
- LV – Davante Adams – 7 receptions, 153 yards, 2 TD

With the overtime win, the 49ers improved to 12-4 and they finished 3-2 against the AFC and 5-3 on the road.

==== Week 18: vs. Arizona Cardinals ====
Week 18: Arizona Cardinals at San Francisco 49ers – Game summary

Quarter	1	2	3	4	Total
Cardinals	6	7	0	0	**13**
**49ers**	7	14	17	0	**38**

at Levi's Stadium, Santa Clara, California

- Date: January 8
- Game time: 1:25 p.m. PST
- Game weather: Cloudy, 60 °F (16 °C)
- Game attendance: 71,638
- Referee: Adrian Hill
- TV announcers (Fox): Chris Myers, Robert Smith, and Jen Hale
- Recap, Game Book

Game information

**First quarter**

- ARI – A. J. Green 77-yard pass from David Blough (kick failed), 14:18. Cardinals 6–0. **Drive: 2 plays, 80 yards, 0:42.**
- SF – Christian McCaffrey 21-yard pass from Brock Purdy (Robbie Gould kick), 10:40. 49ers 7–6. **Drive: 6 plays, 75 yards, 3:38.**

**Second quarter**

- SF – Elijah Mitchell 5-yard run (Robbie Gould kick), 12:07. 49ers 14–6. **Drive: 3 plays, 18 yards, 1:43.**
- ARI – Corey Clement 1-yard run (Matt Prater kick), 4:41. 49ers 14–13. **Drive: 12 plays, 75 yards, 7:26.**
- SF – George Kittle 4-yard pass from Brock Purdy (Robbie Gould kick), 0:19. 49ers 21–13. **Drive: 9 plays, 66 yards, 4:22.**

**Third quarter**

- SF – Elijah Mitchell 6-yard run (Robbie Gould kick), 11:32. 49ers 28–13. **Drive: 7 plays, 75 yards, 3:28.**
- SF – Robbie Gould 27-yard field goal, 5:47. 49ers 31–13. **Drive: 8 plays, 25 yards, 4:36.**
- SF – George Kittle 1-yard pass from Brock Purdy (Robbie Gould kick), 1:01. 49ers 38–13. **Drive: 6 plays, 28 yards, 3:12.**

**Fourth quarter**

- No scoring plays.

**Top passers**

- ARI – David Blough – 14/18, 180 yards, TD, 2 INT
- SF – Brock Purdy – 15/20, 178 yards, 3 TD

**Top rushers**

- ARI – Corey Clement – 8 rushes, 23 yards, TD
- SF – Elijah Mitchell – 5 rush, 55 yards, 2 TD

**Top receivers**

- ARI – A. J. Green – 3 receptions, 91 yards, TD
- SF – Brandon Aiyuk – 4 receptions, 59 yards

With the win, the 49ers finished the regular season at 13-4 and they finished 8-1 at home while sweeping the NFC West.

=== Standings ===
==== Division ====
NFC West
	W	L	T	PCT	DIV	CONF	PF	PA	STK
^{(2)} San Francisco 49ers	13	4	0	.765	6–0	10–2	450	277	W10
^{(7)} Seattle Seahawks	9	8	0	.529	4–2	6–6	407	401	W2
Los Angeles Rams	5	12	0	.294	1–5	3–9	307	384	L2
Arizona Cardinals	4	13	0	.235	1–5	3–9	340	449	L7

==== Conference ====
NFC
#	Team	Division	W	L	T	PCT	DIV	CONF	SOS	SOV	STK
**Division leaders**
1	Philadelphia Eagles	East	14	3	0	.824	4–2	9–3	.474	.460	W1
2 (Note: San Francisco claimed the No. 2 seed over Minnesota based on conference record (10–2 vs. 8–4).)	San Francisco 49ers	West	13	4	0	.765	6–0	10–2	.417	.414	W10
3	Minnesota Vikings	North	13	4	0	.765	4–2	8–4	.474	.425	W1
4	Tampa Bay Buccaneers	South	8	9	0	.471	4–2	8–4	.503	.426	L1
**Wild cards**
5	Dallas Cowboys	East	12	5	0	.706	4–2	8–4	.507	.485	L1
6	New York Giants	East	9	7	1	.559	1–4–1	4–7–1	.526	.395	L1
7 (Note: Seattle finished ahead of Detroit based on head-to-head victory, claiming the 7th and final playoff spot.)	Seattle Seahawks	West	9	8	0	.529	4–2	6–6	.462	.382	W2
**Did not qualify for the postseason**
8	Detroit Lions	North	9	8	0	.529	5–1	7–5	.535	.451	W2
9	Washington Commanders	East	8	8	1	.500	2–3–1	5–6–1	.536	.449	W1
10	Green Bay Packers	North	8	9	0	.471	3–3	6–6	.524	.449	L1
11 (Note: Carolina finished ahead of New Orleans and Atlanta based on head-to-head record (3–1 vs. 2–2/1–3).)	Carolina Panthers	South	7	10	0	.412	4–2	6–6	.474	.437	W1
12 (Note: New Orleans finished ahead of Atlanta based on head-to-head sweep.)	New Orleans Saints	South	7	10	0	.412	2–4	5–7	.507	.462	L1
13	Atlanta Falcons	South	7	10	0	.412	2–4	6–6	.467	.429	W2
14	Los Angeles Rams	West	5	12	0	.294	1–5	3–9	.517	.341	L2
15	Arizona Cardinals	West	4	13	0	.235	1–5	3–9	.529	.368	L7
16	Chicago Bears	North	3	14	0	.176	0–6	1–11	.571	.480	L10
**Tiebreakers** (Note: When breaking ties for three or more teams under the NFL's rules, they are first broken within divisions, then comparing only the highest-ranked remaining team from each division.)

== Postseason ==
=== Schedule ===
Round	Date	Opponent (seed)	Result	Record	Venue	Recap
Wild Card	January 14	Seattle Seahawks (7)	W 41–23	1–0	Levi's Stadium	Recap
Divisional	January 22	Dallas Cowboys (5)	W 19–12	2–0	Levi's Stadium	Recap
NFC Championship	January 29	at Philadelphia Eagles (1)	L 7–31	2–1	Lincoln Financial Field	Recap

=== Game summaries ===
==== NFC Wild Card Playoffs: vs. (7) Seattle Seahawks ====
NFC Wild Card Playoffs: (7) Seattle Seahawks at (2) San Francisco 49ers – Game summary

Quarter	1	2	3	4	Total
Seahawks	0	17	0	6	23
49ers	10	6	7	18	41

at Levi's Stadium, Santa Clara, California

- Date: January 14, 2023
- Game time: 1:30 p.m. PST
- Game weather: Rain, 57 °F (14 °C)
- Game attendance: 71,299
- Referee: Alex Kemp
- TV announcers (Fox): Joe Davis, Daryl Johnston, Pam Oliver, and Kristina Pink
- Recap, Game Book

Game information

First quarter

- SF – Robbie Gould 34-yard field goal, 10:13. 49ers 3–0. Drive: 7 plays, 48 yards, 2:22.
- SF – Christian McCaffrey 3-yard pass from Brock Purdy (Robbie Gould kick), 5:11. 49ers 10–0. Drive: 5 plays, 85 yards, 2:51.

Second quarter

- SEA – Kenneth Walker III 7-yard run (Jason Myers kick), 13:14. 49ers 10–7. Drive: 14 plays, 78 yards, 6:57.
- SF – Robbie Gould 33-yard field goal, 7:41. 49ers 13–7. Drive: 10 plays, 60 yards, 5:33.
- SEA – DK Metcalf 50-yard pass from Geno Smith (Jason Myers kick), 5:01. Seahawks 14–13. Drive: 5 plays, 71 yards, 2:40.
- SF – Robbie Gould 46-yard field goal, 0:17. 49ers 16–14. Drive: 8 plays, 49 yards, 0:55.
- SEA – Jason Myers 56-yard field goal, 0:00. Seahawks 17–16. Drive: 2 plays, 24 yards, 0:13.

Third quarter

- SF – Brock Purdy 1-yard run (Robbie Gould kick), 7:15. 49ers 23–17. Drive: 13 plays, 75 yards, 7:45.

Fourth quarter

- SF – Elijah Mitchell 7-yard pass from Brock Purdy (Brock Purdy–George Kittle pass), 14:02. 49ers 31–17. Drive: 7 plays, 70 yards, 3:23.
- SF – Deebo Samuel 74-yard pass from Brock Purdy (Robbie Gould kick), 10:51. 49ers 38–17. Drive: 2 plays, 76 yards, 0:54.
- SF – Robbie Gould 31-yard field goal, 4:56. 49ers 41–17. Drive: 10 plays, 24 yards, 5:49.
- SEA – DK Metcalf 3-yard pass from Geno Smith (pass failed), 1:48. 49ers 41–23. Drive: 15 plays, 76 yards, 3:08.

Top passers

- SEA – Geno Smith – 25/35, 253 yards, 2 TD, INT
- SF – Brock Purdy – 18/30, 332 yards, 3 TD

Top rushers

- SEA – Kenneth Walker III – 15 rushes, 63 yards, TD
- SF – Christian McCaffrey – 15 rush, 119 yards

Top receivers

- SEA – DK Metcalf – 10 receptions, 136 yards, 2 TD
- SF – Deebo Samuel – 6 receptions, 133 yards, TD

==== NFC Divisional Playoffs: vs. (5) Dallas Cowboys ====
NFC Divisional Playoffs: (5) Dallas Cowboys at (2) San Francisco 49ers – Game summary

Quarter	1	2	3	4	Total
Cowboys	0	6	3	3	12
49ers	3	6	0	10	19

at Levi's Stadium, Santa Clara, California

- Date: January 22, 2023
- Game time: 3:40 p.m. PST
- Game weather: Clear, 59 °F (15 °C)
- Game attendance: 71,888
- Referee: Bill Vinovich
- TV announcers (Fox): Kevin Burkhardt, Greg Olsen, Erin Andrews, and Tom Rinaldi
- Recap, Game Book

Game information

First quarter

- SF – Robbie Gould 26-yard field goal, 2:12. 49ers 3–0. Drive: 7 plays, 13 yards, 3:37.

Second quarter

- DAL – Dalton Schultz 3-yard pass from Dak Prescott (kick blocked), 9:25. Cowboys 6–3. Drive: 14 plays, 74 yards, 7:47.
- SF – Robbie Gould 47-yard field goal, 3:43. Tied 6–6. Drive: 10 plays, 46 yards, 5:42.
- SF – Robbie Gould 50-yard field goal, 0:00. 49ers 9–6. Drive: 8 plays, 40 yards, 1:15.

Third quarter

- DAL – Brett Maher 25-yard field goal, 9:08. Tied 9–9. Drive: 6 plays, 14 yards, 2:33.

Fourth quarter

- SF – Christian McCaffrey 2-yard rush (Robbie Gould kick), 14:58. 49ers 16–9. Drive: 10 plays, 91 yards, 6:00.
- DAL – Brett Maher 43-yard field goal, 11:03. 49ers 16–12. Drive: 8 plays, 32 yards, 3:55.
- SF – Robbie Gould 28-yard field goal, 3:08. 49ers 19–12. Drive: 13 plays, 64 yards, 7:59.

Top passers

- DAL – Dak Prescott – 23/37, 206 yards, 1 TD, 2 INT
- SF – Brock Purdy – 19/29, 214 yards

Top rushers

- DAL – Ezekiel Elliott – 10 rushes, 26 yards
- SF – Elijah Mitchell – 14 rushes, 51 yards

Top receivers

- DAL – CeeDee Lamb – 10 receptions, 117 yards
- SF – George Kittle – 5 receptions, 95 yards

==== NFC Championship: at (1) Philadelphia Eagles ====
NFC Championship: (2) San Francisco 49ers at (1) Philadelphia Eagles – Game summary

Quarter	1	2	3	4	Total
49ers	0	7	0	0	7
Eagles	7	14	7	3	31

at Lincoln Financial Field, Philadelphia, Pennsylvania

- Date: January 29, 2023
- Game time: 3:05 p.m. EST/12:05 p.m. PST
- Game weather: Rain, 51 °F (11 °C)
- Game attendance: 69,879
- Referee: John Hussey
- TV announcers (Fox): Kevin Burkhardt, Greg Olsen, Erin Andrews, and Tom Rinaldi
- Recap, Game Book

Game information

First quarter

- PHI – Miles Sanders 6-yard rush (Jake Elliott kick), 9:48. Eagles 7–0. Drive: 11 plays, 66 yards, 5:12.

Second quarter

- SF – Christian McCaffrey 23-yard rush (Robbie Gould kick), 8:29. Tied 7–7. Drive: 6 plays, 46 yards, 2:46.
- PHI – Miles Sanders 13-yard rush (Jake Elliott kick), 1:36. Eagles 14–7. Drive: 14 plays, 75 yards, 6:53.
- PHI – Boston Scott 10-yard rush (Jake Elliott kick), 0:16. Eagles 21–7. Drive: 3 plays, 30 yards, 0:55.

Third quarter

- PHI – Jalen Hurts 1-yard rush (Jake Elliott kick), 0:43. Eagles 28–7. Drive: 15 plays, 91 yards, 7:50.

Fourth quarter

- PHI – Jake Elliott 31-yard field goal, 5:17. Eagles 31–7. Drive: 9 plays, 30 yards, 5:35.

Top passers

- SF – Josh Johnson – 7/13, 74 yards
- PHI – Jalen Hurts – 15/25, 121 yards

Top rushers

- SF – Christian McCaffrey – 15 rushes, 84 yards, TD
- PHI – Kenneth Gainwell – 14 rushes, 48 yards

Top receivers

- SF – Deebo Samuel – 3 receptions, 33 yards
- PHI – DeVonta Smith – 2 receptions, 36 yards

== Statistics ==
=== Team ===
Category	Total yards	Yards per game	NFL rank (out of 32)
Passing offense	3,856	226.8	13th
Rushing offense	2,360	138.8	8th
Total offense	6,216	365.6	5th
Passing defense	3,789	222.9	20th
Rushing defense	1,321	77.7	2nd
Total defense	5,110	300.6	1st

=== Individual ===
Category	Player	Total yards
Offense
Passing	Jimmy Garoppolo	2,437
Rushing	Christian McCaffrey	746
Receiving	Brandon Aiyuk	1,015
Defense
Tackles (Solo)	Dre Greenlaw	82
Sacks	Nick Bosa	18.5
Interceptions	Tashaun Gipson	5

Statistics correct as of the end of the 2022 NFL season
