= Tyler Kroft =

American football player (born 1992)

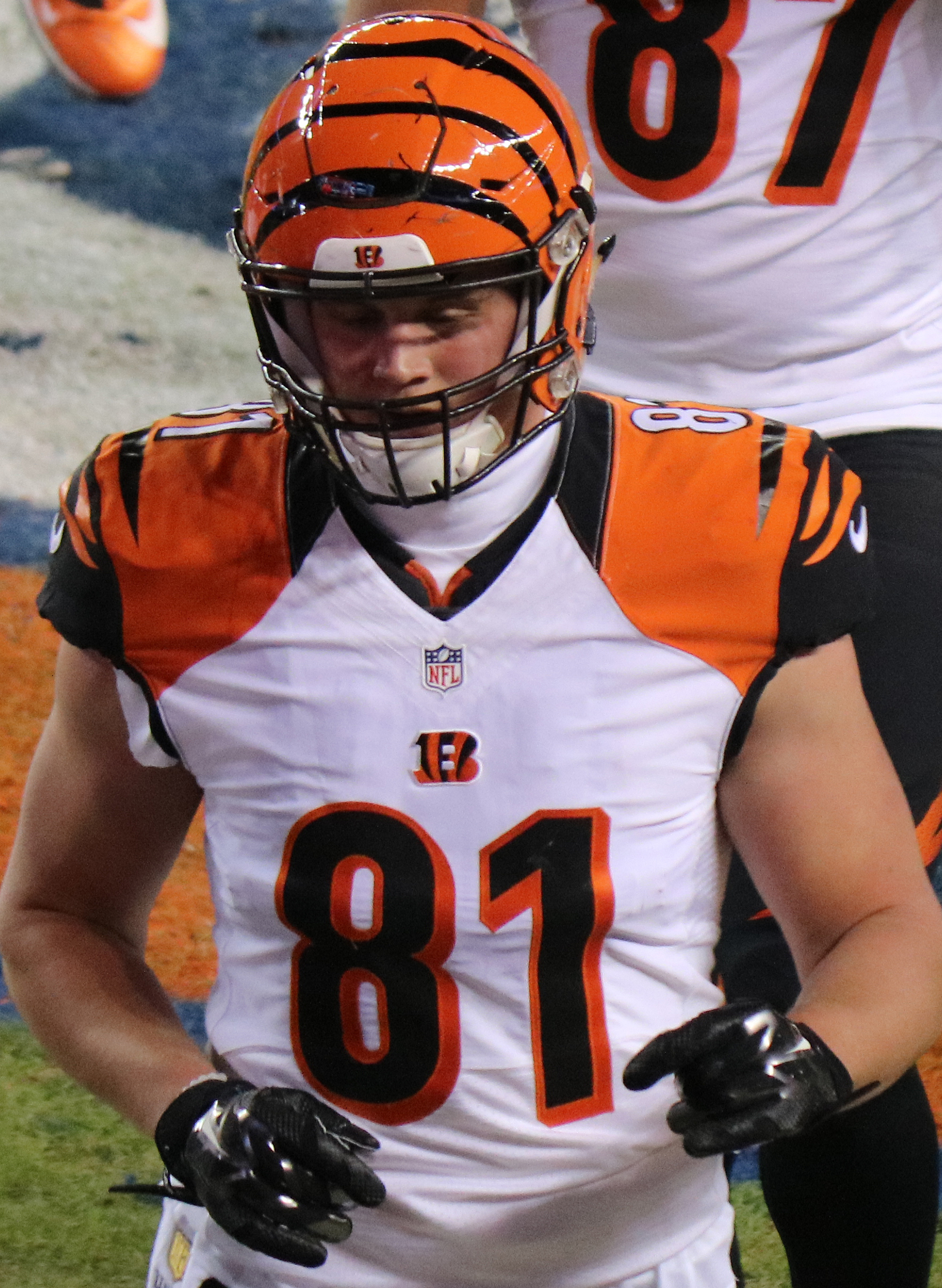
- Kroft with the Cincinnati Bengals in 2015

No. 81
- Position: Tight end

Personal information
- Born: October 15, 1992 (age 34); West Chester, Pennsylvania, U.S.
- Listed height: 6 ft 6 in (1.98 m)
- Listed weight: 252 lb (114 kg)

Career information
- High school: Downingtown East (Lionville, Pennsylvania)
- College: Rutgers
- NFL draft: 2015: 3rd round, 85th overall pick

Career history
- Cincinnati Bengals (2015–2018); Buffalo Bills (2019–2020); New York Jets (2021); San Francisco 49ers (2022); Miami Dolphins (2023)

Awards and highlights
- First-team All-AAC (2013)

Career NFL statistics as of 2023
- Receptions: 105
- Receiving yards: 1,081
- Receiving touchdowns: 13
- Stats at Pro Football Reference

Tyler Kroft (born October 15, 1992) is an American professional football tight end. He played college football for the Rutgers Scarlet Knights and was selected in the third round of the 2015 NFL draft by the Cincinnati Bengals. He has also played for the Buffalo Bills, New York Jets and San Francisco 49ers.

== Early life ==
Kroft attended Downingtown East High School in Downingtown, Pennsylvania. He played tight end and wide receiver for the football team. He was rated by Rivals.com as a three-star recruit. He committed to Rutgers University to play college football. He is of German descent.

== College career ==
Kroft was redshirted as a freshman in 2011 at Rutgers. As a redshirt freshman in 2012, he played in 11 games and had three receptions for 59 yards and a touchdown. As a redshirt sophomore in 2013, Kroft started 12 of 13 games, including a career-best 133 yards against Arkansas. On the season, he had a team-leading 43 receptions and 573 yards, along with four touchdowns, and was a first-team all-conference selection. Kroft started 12 of 13 games as a redshirt junior in 2014, but took on a restricted role and reached neither five receptions nor 50 yards in any of them. On the season, he had 24 receptions for 269 yards. He was awarded the "Loyal Knight" award for his willingness to scale back.

After his redshirt junior season, he entered the 2015 NFL draft. He finished his collegiate career with 70 receptions for 901 yards and five touchdowns.

== Professional career ==
Pre-draft measurables
Height	Weight	Arm length	Hand span	40-yard dash	10-yard split	20-yard split	20-yard shuttle	Three-cone drill	Vertical jump	Broad jump	Bench press
6 ft 5 1/2 in (1.97 m)	246 lb (112 kg)	33 in (0.84 m)	9 5/8 in (0.24 m)	4.75 s	1.65 s	2.79 s	4.50 s	7.18 s	34.0 in (0.86 m)	10 ft 0 in (3.05 m)	17 reps
All values from NFL Combine/Pro Day

=== Cincinnati Bengals ===
Kroft was drafted by the Cincinnati Bengals in the third round, 85th overall, in the 2015 NFL Draft. He played back-up to Pro Bowl tight end Tyler Eifert. He caught his first career touchdown in Week 16 against the San Francisco 49ers on a 20-yard pass from A. J. McCarron. He played in all 16 games his rookie season with six starts, recording 11 receptions for 129 yards and one touchdown.

Kroft was third on the depth chart behind Eifert and C. J. Uzomah for much of the 2016 season, compiling ten receptions for 92 yards off the bench.

Kroft began the 2017 season behind Tyler Eifert, but after Eifert was injured in Week 2, Kroft took the starting role. In Week 4, he had six receptions for 68 yards and two touchdowns against the Cleveland Browns, leading the team and setting career bests in all three categories. In Week 9, he had a career-long 59-yard reception against the Jacksonville Jaguars en route to a career-best 79 receiving yards. In Weeks 11 and 12 he had back-to-back receiving touchdowns for the first time in his career, both of one yard; the one in Week 11 occurred after teammate Dre Kirkpatrick returned an interception 101 yards, but committed an unforced fumble just before reaching the end zone. He finished the 2017 season with 42 receptions for 404 receiving yards and seven receiving touchdowns.

In 2018, Kroft suffered a foot injury in Week 5 and missed the next five games in hopes he could return. He was placed on injured reserve on November 16, 2018, officially ending his season. He played in five games and finished with four receptions for 36 yards.

=== Buffalo Bills ===
On March 13, 2019, Kroft signed a three-year $18.75 million contract with the Buffalo Bills. On May 20, on the first day of organized team activities, he broke his foot during practice, which required surgery. Kroft finished the season with six catches for 71 yards and a touchdown, which he scored during a Week 15 game against the Pittsburgh Steelers in the fourth quarter, allowing the Bills to win 17–10 and clinch a playoff spot.

In Week 3 of the 2020 season against the Los Angeles Rams, Kroft filled in for injured starter Dawson Knox, catching four passes for 24 yards and two touchdowns, including the game-winning score from Josh Allen as Buffalo won 35–32. Kroft was placed on the reserve/COVID-19 list by the team on November 14, 2020, and activated on November 19. He was placed back on the COVID-19 list on January 2, 2021, and activated again two days later. Overall, he finished the 2020 season with 12 receptions for 119 receiving yards and three receiving touchdowns.

=== New York Jets ===
Kroft signed a one-year contract with the New York Jets on March 22, 2021. On November 9, 2021, Kroft was placed on injured reserve after suffering a chest injury in Week 9. He was activated on December 18.

Kroft finished the season with 16 catches for 173 yards and a touchdown in nine games, starting six.

=== San Francisco 49ers ===
On May 23, 2022, Kroft signed with the 49ers. He was released by San Francisco during final roster cuts on August 30, but re–signed with the team the following day. He appeared in 11 games and started four in the 2022 season. Kroft was the subject of criticism following the NFC Championship Game against the Philadelphia Eagles, as he was lined up on the right side of the offensive line when Eagles edge rusher Haason Reddick collided with quarterback Brock Purdy's arm, resulting in a Ulnar collateral ligament injury of the elbow that led to Purdy being ruled out for the rest of the game. Many in the media attributed blame towards Kyle Shanahan's play-calling, citing it as confusing and negligent.

=== Miami Dolphins ===
On May 9, 2023, Kroft signed with the Miami Dolphins. He appeared in eight games with the Dolphins in the 2023 season.

== Career statistics ==
=== NFL ===
Year	Team	GP	Receiving				
Year	Team	GP	Rec	Yds	Avg	Lng	TD
2015	CIN	16	11	129	11.7	22	1
2016	CIN	14	10	92	9.2	21	0
2017	CIN	13	42	404	9.6	59	7
2018	CIN	5	4	36	9.0	16	0
2019	BUF	11	6	71	11.8	20	1
2020	BUF	7	10	107	10.7	38	2
2021	NYJ	9	16	173	10.8	26	1
2022	SF	11	4	57	14.3	28	0
2023	MIA	8	0	0	0	0	0
Career		100	105	1,081	10.3	59	13

=== College ===
Season	Team	GP	Receiving			
Season	Team	GP	Rec	Yds	Avg	TD
2012	Rutgers	11	3	59	19.7	1
2013	Rutgers	13	43	573	13.3	4
2014	Rutgers	10	24	269	11.2	0
Career		34	70	901	12.9	5

== Personal life ==
Kroft is married and has two children.
