= Ray-Ray McCloud =

American football player (born 1996)

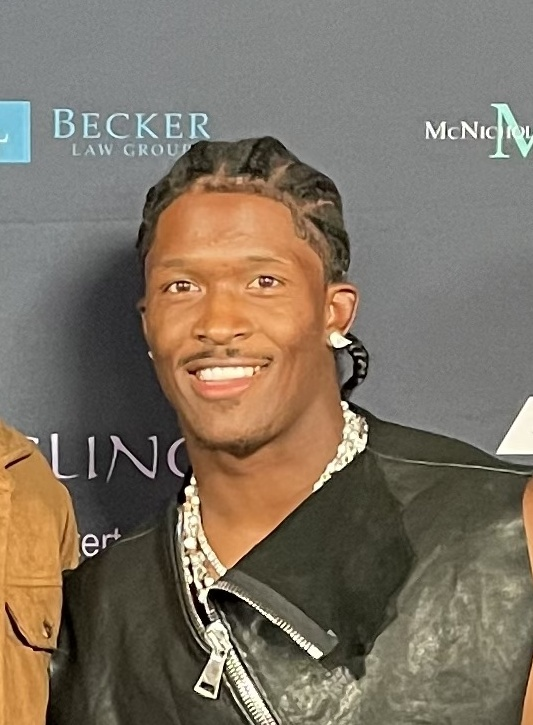
- McCloud in 2025

Profile
- Position: Wide receiver

Personal information
- Born: October 15, 1996 (age 30); Tampa, Florida, U.S.
- Listed height: 5 ft 9 in (1.75 m)
- Listed weight: 185 lb (84 kg)

Career information
- High school: Sickles (Tampa, Florida)
- College: Clemson (2015–2017)
- NFL draft: 2018: 6th round, 187th overall pick

Career history
- Buffalo Bills (2018); Carolina Panthers (2019); Buffalo Bills (2019–2020)*; Pittsburgh Steelers (2020–2021); San Francisco 49ers (2022–2023); Atlanta Falcons (2024–2025); New York Giants (2025); Chicago Bears (2026)*
- * Offseason or practice squad member only

Awards and highlights
- NFL punt return yards leader (2021); CFP national champion (2016)

Career NFL statistics as of 2025
- Receptions: 159
- Receiving yards: 1,523
- Receiving touchdowns: 2
- Rushing yards: 271
- Rushing average: 10.8
- Rushing touchdowns: 1
- Return yards: 4,216
- Stats at Pro Football Reference

Raymond McCloud III (born October 15, 1996) is an American professional football wide receiver and return specialist. He played college football for the Clemson Tigers and was drafted by the Buffalo Bills in the sixth round of the 2018 NFL draft. He has also played for the Carolina Panthers, Pittsburgh Steelers, San Francisco 49ers, Atlanta Falcons, and New York Giants.

== Early life ==
McCloud attended Sickles High School in Tampa, Florida and played on the Gryphons football team as a running back. As a senior, he rushed for 1,933 yards and 17 touchdowns. For his high school career, he had 5,765 rushing yards and 58 touchdowns. He committed to play football for the Clemson Tigers in July 2014, choosing them over the likes of Alabama, Auburn, and Florida.

== College career ==
As a freshman in 2015, McCloud played in 12 games, catching 29 passes for 251 yards and one touchdown. He missed three games due to a knee injury.

In 2016, as a sophomore, McCloud played in 14 of Clemson's 15 games, missing one due to an ankle injury. In those 14 games, he tallied 49 receptions for 472 yards and two touchdowns, helping Clemson win the National Championship.

As a junior in 2017, McCloud played in all 14 of Clemson's games, tallying 49 receptions for 503 yards and one touchdown. He also returned 25 punts for 303 yards and one touchdown. He was voted Honorable Mention All-ACC at the conclusion of the 2017 season. Following the season, he declared for the 2018 NFL draft.

== Professional career ==
Pre-draft measurables
Height	Weight	Arm length	Hand span	Wingspan	40-yard dash	10-yard split	20-yard split	20-yard shuttle	Three-cone drill	Vertical jump	Broad jump	Bench press
5 ft 9 1/2 in (1.77 m)	190 lb (86 kg)	30 1/4 in (0.77 m)	9 1/4 in (0.23 m)	6 ft 0 5/8 in (1.84 m)	4.49 s	1.56 s	2.56 s	4.32 s	6.89 s	34.5 in (0.88 m)	9 ft 5 in (2.87 m)	13 reps
All values from NFL Combine/Pro Day

=== Buffalo Bills (first stint) ===
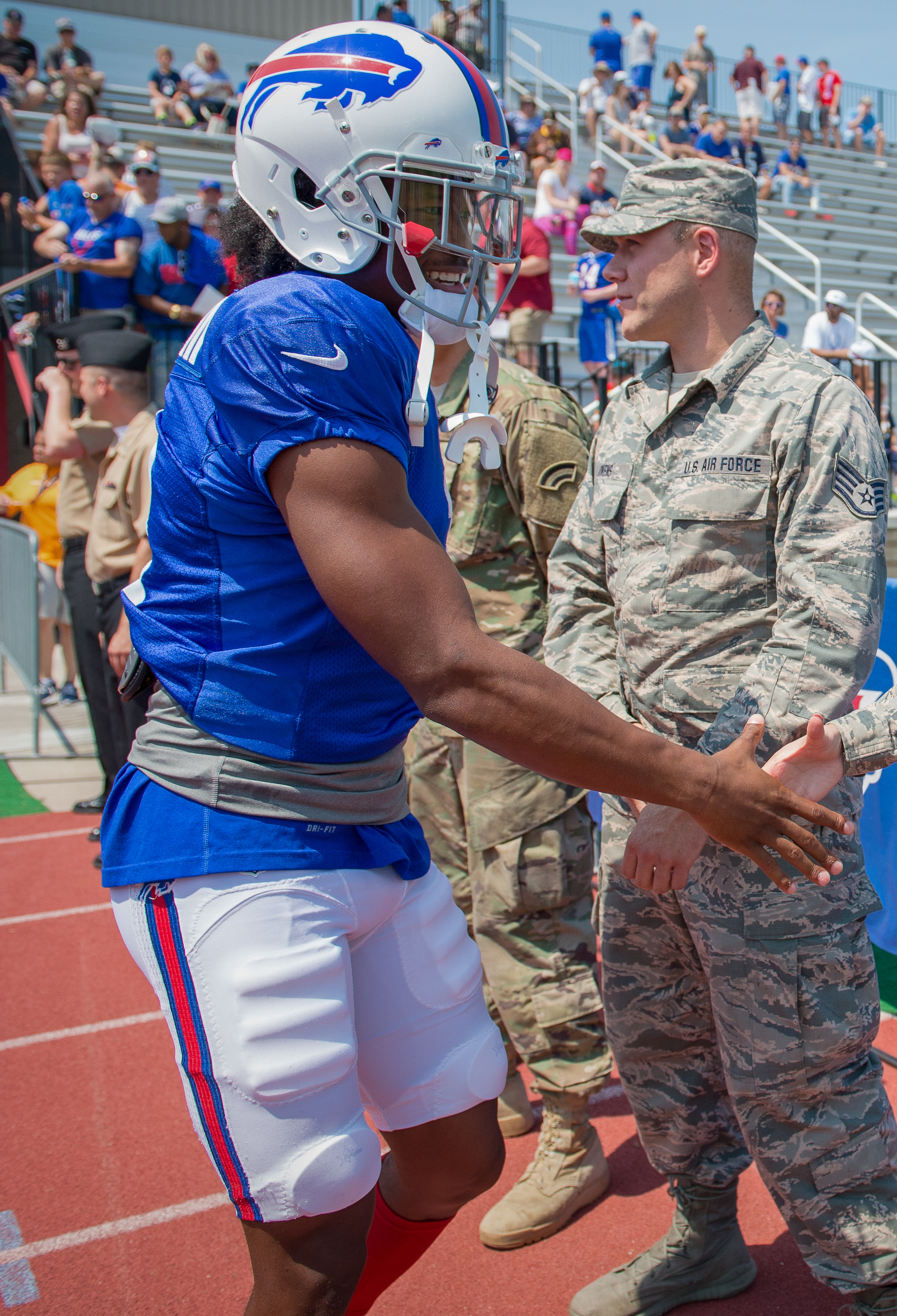
McCloud with the Buffalo Bills in 2018

McCloud was drafted by the Buffalo Bills in the sixth round with the 187th overall pick in the 2018 NFL draft. In Week 3, in a 27–6 victory over the Minnesota Vikings, he made his first professional reception and had a 13-yard punt return.

On August 31, 2019, McCloud was waived by the Bills.

=== Carolina Panthers ===
On September 1, 2019, McCloud was claimed off waivers by the Carolina Panthers. He was waived by Carolina on October 15.

=== Buffalo Bills (second stint) ===
On October 17, 2019, McCloud was signed to the Buffalo Bills' practice squad. In addition to serving as a wide receiver, McCloud served as the scout team quarterback, emulating the style of mobile quarterbacks the Bills face that week. He signed a reserve/future contract with the Bills on January 6, 2020. McCloud was waived by Buffalo on July 27.

=== Pittsburgh Steelers ===
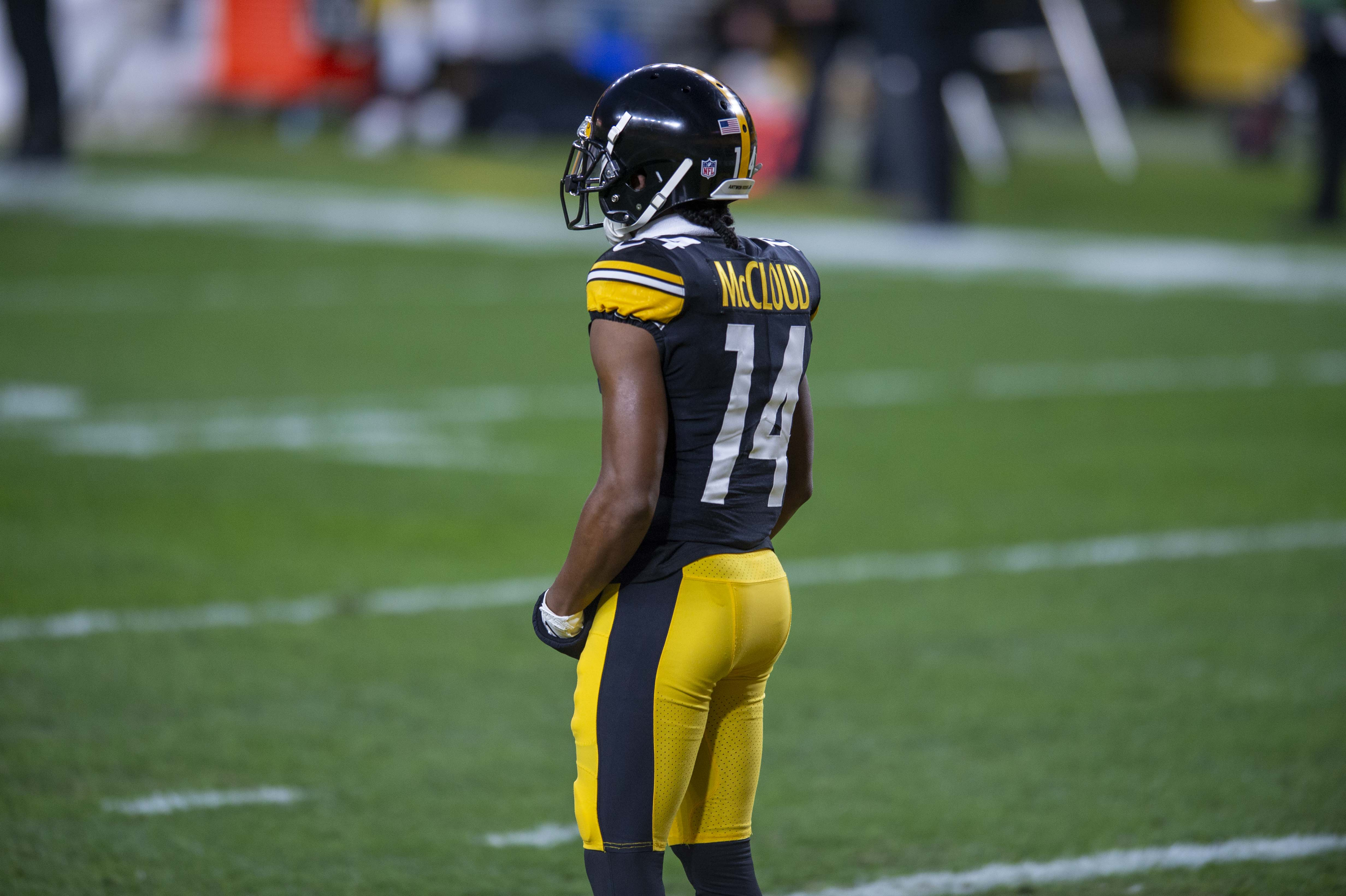
McCloud with the Steelers in 2020

On August 21, 2020, McCloud signed with the Pittsburgh Steelers. McCloud signed a one-year contract extension with the Steelers on March 11, 2021. McCloud became the Steelers' primary return specialist, returning 28 kickoffs for 646 yards and 29 punts with an average of 10.7 yards. He was named by Pro Football Focus on its All-Pro roster as a second-team return specialist.

In 2021, McCloud led the NFL in total punt-return yards gained. He recorded 39 receptions for 277 receiving yards on the season.

=== San Francisco 49ers ===
On March 22, 2022, McCloud signed a two-year contract with the San Francisco 49ers. On October 23, in Week 7 against the Kansas City Chiefs, McCloud scored his first career touchdown on an 8–yard pass from Jimmy Garoppolo. McCloud finished the 2022 season with 14 receptions for 243 yards and one receiving touchdown to go with a rushing touchdown. He handled some kickoff and punt return duties on special teams.

McCloud was placed on injured reserve on December 9, 2023. He was activated on January 6, 2024. McCloud finished the 2023 season with 12 receptions for 135 yards while handling some kickoff and punt return duties. The 49ers reached Super Bowl LVIII, but lost 25-22 to the Kansas City Chiefs. In the Super Bowl, McCloud had one catch for 19 yards.

=== Atlanta Falcons ===
On March 18, 2024, McCloud signed a two-year contract with the Atlanta Falcons. McCloud finished with 62 receptions for 686 yards and one touchdown.

McCloud was released on October 21, 2025 after being a healthy scratch in a Week 6 matchup against the Buffalo Bills, and was sent home for an "excused absence" during the prep week for a Week 7 matchup against the San Francisco 49ers and did not travel with the team. In four appearances for Atlanta; he had logged six receptions for 64 scoreless yards.

=== New York Giants ===
On October 23, 2025, McCloud signed with the New York Giants' practice squad. He made two appearances for New York, posting one reception for five yards. McCloud was released by the Giants on December 10.

=== Chicago Bears ===
On August 10, 2026, McCloud signed with the Chicago Bears. He was placed on injured reserve due to an undisclosed injury on August 30. On September 4, McCloud was released by the Bears with an injury settlement.

== Career statistics ==
Legend
**Bold**	Career high

=== NFL ===
==== Regular season ====
Year	Team	Games		Receiving					Rushing					Returning					Fumbles	
Year	Team	GP	GS	Rec	Yds	Avg	Lng	TD	Att	Yds	Avg	Lng	TD	Ret	Yds	Avg	Lng	TD	Fum	Lost
2018	BUF	10	1	5	36	7.2	16	0	2	4	2.0	7	0	5	38	7.6	18	0	2	1
2019	CAR	6	0	—	—	—	—	—	—	—	—	—	—	18	256	14.2	39	0	3	1
2020	PIT	16	2	20	77	3.8	13	0	4	65	16.3	58	0	57	944	16.6	**57**	0	2	1
2021	PIT	16	5	39	277	7.1	24	0	2	15	7.5	10	0	**73**	**1,143**	15.7	40	0	**4**	1
2022	SF	17	2	14	243	**17.4**	42	**1**	4	78	**19.5**	**71**	**1**	59	955	16.2	39	0	2	0
2023	SF	12	1	12	135	11.3	41	0	3	30	1.0	15	0	34	428	12.6	34	0	1	0
2024	ATL	17	13	**62**	**686**	11.1	**60**	**1**	**10**	**79**	7.9	20	0	14	361	**25.8**	33	0	**4**	**2**
2025	ATL	4	1	**6**	**64**	10.7	**24**	**0**	**0**	**0**	0	0	0	6	91	**15.2**	30	0	**0**	**0**
2025	NYG	2	0	**1**	**5**	5	**5**	**0**	**0**	**0**	0	0	0	0	0	**0**	0	0	**0**	**0**
Career		94	24	152	1,454	9.6	60	2	25	271	10.8	71	1	260	4,125	16.2	57	0	18	6

==== Postseason ====
Year	Team	Games		Receiving					Rushing					Returning					Fumbles	
Year	Team	GP	GS	Rec	Yds	Avg	Lng	TD	Att	Yds	Avg	Lng	TD	Ret	Yds	Avg	Lng	TD	Fum	Lost
2020	PIT	1	0	—	—	—	—	—	—	—	—	—	—	8	**162**	20.3	28	0	0	0
2021	PIT	1	0	**2**	20	10.0	12	0	—	—	—	—	—	5	79	15.8	29	0	0	0
2022	SF	3	0	—	—	—	—	—	—	—	—	—	—	7	145	**20.7**	**53**	0	**1**	0
2023	SF	1	0	**2**	**26**	**13.0**	**19**	0	—	—	—	—	—	3	51	17.0	28	0	0	0
Career		6	0	4	46	11.5	19	0	0	0	0	0	0	23	437	18.4	53	0	1	0

=== College ===
Year	School	Conf	Class	Pos	G	Receiving				Rushing				Scrimmage			
Year	School	Conf	Class	Pos	G	Rec	Yds	Avg	TD	Att	Yds	Avg	TD	Plays	Yds	Avg	TD
2015	Clemson	ACC	FR	WR	12	29	251	8.7	1	**7**	**48**	**6.9**	0	36	299	8.3	1
2016	Clemson	ACC	SO	WR	13	**49**	472	9.6	**2**	5	28	5.6	0	54	500	9.3	**2**
2017	Clemson	ACC	JR	WR	14	**49**	**503**	**10.3**	1	6	30	5.0	0	**55**	**533**	**9.7**	1
**Career**					**39**	**127**	**1,226**	**9.7**	**4**	**18**	**106**	**5.9**	**0**	**145**	**1,332**	**9.2**	**4**

== Personal life ==
McCloud is the older brother of quarterback Jordan McCloud.
