= Ross Dwelley =

American football player (born 1995)

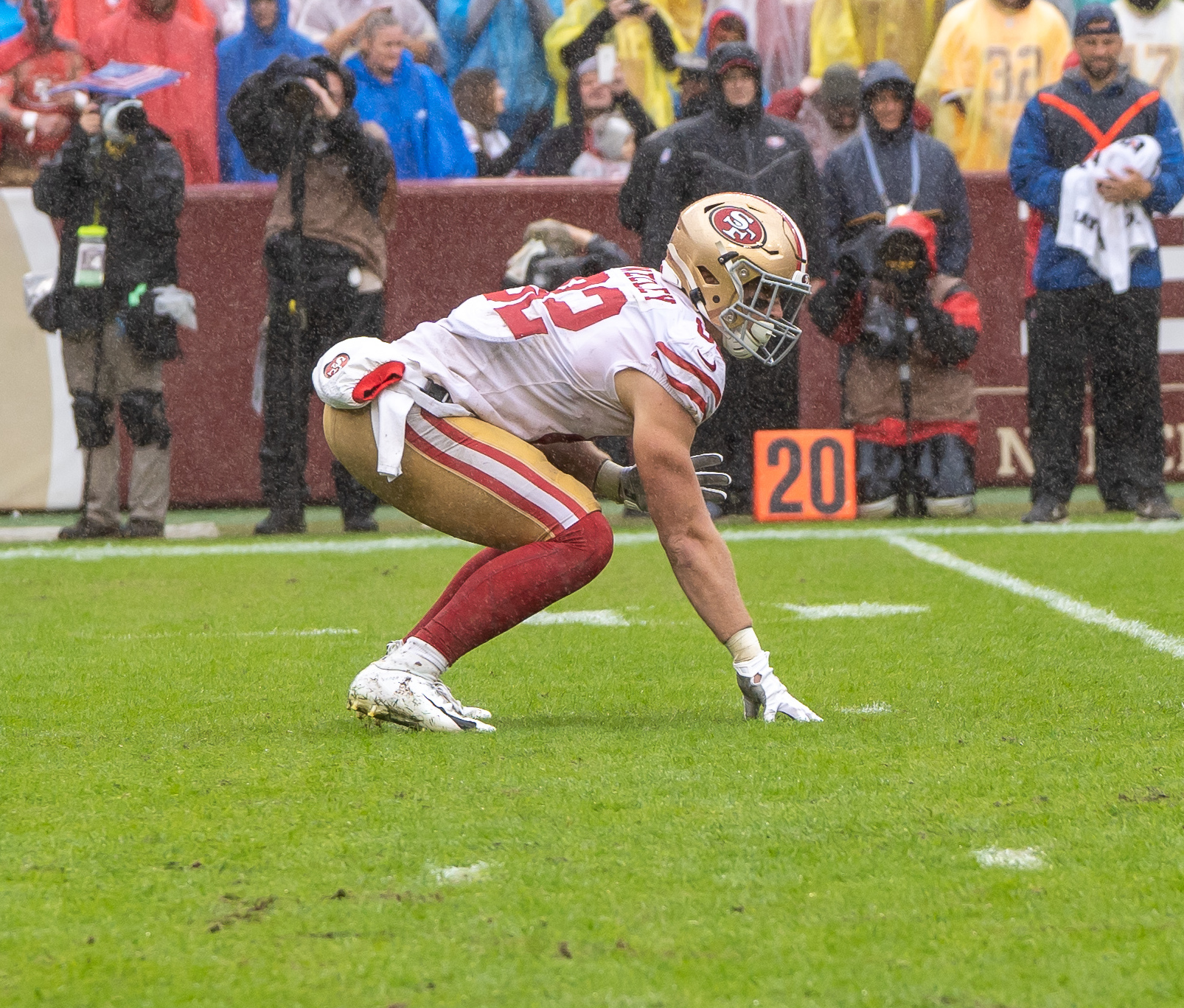
- Dwelley with the San Francisco 49ers in 2019

Profile
- Position: Tight end

Personal information
- Born: January 26, 1995 (age 31); Sonora, California, U.S.
- Listed height: 6 ft 5 in (1.96 m)
- Listed weight: 235 lb (107 kg)

Career information
- High school: Oak Ridge (El Dorado Hills, California)
- College: San Diego (2013–2017)
- NFL draft: 2018: undrafted

Career history
- San Francisco 49ers (2018–2023); Atlanta Falcons (2024); San Francisco 49ers (2025)*; Detroit Lions (2025); Carolina Panthers (2025)*
- * Offseason or practice squad member only

Awards and highlights
- Third-team FCS All-American (2017); First-team All-PFL (2017); 3× Second-team All-PFL (2014—2016)

Career NFL statistics as of 2024
- Receptions: 45
- Receiving yards: 523
- Receiving touchdowns: 5
- Stats at Pro Football Reference

Ross Dwelley (born January 26, 1995) is an American professional football tight end. He played college football for the San Diego Toreros and signed with the 49ers as an undrafted free agent in 2018.

== Early life ==
Dwelley attended Oak Ridge High School in El Dorado Hills, California, where he played baseball and football. Originally a quarterback during his first two seasons, Dwelley opted not to play football his junior year to focus on baseball but was convinced by Oak Ridge's football coach to return to the sport for his senior season. After moving to tight end, Dwelley made 43 catches for 568 receiving yards and five touchdowns and was named the team's offensive MVP.

== College career ==
After redshirting his freshman year, Dwelley appeared in 47 games (44 starts) over the course of four seasons with the Toreros. During that time he totaled 197 receptions for 2,305 yards and 26 touchdowns. Dwelley was named 2nd team All-Pioneer Football League during his sophomore after leading the Toreros with 54 receptions for 580 yards and three touchdowns and again as a junior after catching 70 passes for 843 yards and 10 touchdowns. During his senior season Dwelley had 50 receptions for 663 yards led all Football Championship Subdivision tight ends with 10 touchdown receptions, despite missing two games due to injury, and was named first-team All-Pioneer League. Dwelley graduated from USD with a degree in industrial and systems engineering.

== Professional career ==
Pre-draft measurables
Height	Weight	Arm length	Hand span	40-yard dash	10-yard split	20-yard split	20-yard shuttle	Three-cone drill	Vertical jump	Broad jump
6 ft 4 3/4 in (1.95 m)	241 lb (109 kg)	31 1/8 in (0.79 m)	9 7/8 in (0.25 m)	4.90 s	1.70 s	2.82 s	4.40 s	7.10 s	27.5 in (0.70 m)	8 ft 6 in (2.59 m)
All values from Pro Day

=== San Francisco 49ers (first stint) ===
==== 2018 season ====
Dwelley signed with the San Francisco 49ers as an undrafted free agent on April 30, 2018. He was initially cut at the end of training camp and subsequently signed to the team's practice squad.

Dwelley was promoted from the practice squad to the 49ers' active roster on October 15, 2018, and made his NFL debut on the same night in a 30–33 road loss to the Green Bay Packers on Monday Night Football. Three weeks later, he caught his first NFL pass, an eight-yard reception, in a 34–3 victory over the Oakland Raiders.

Dwelley finished his rookie year with two catches for 14 yards in 11 games and no starts.

==== 2019 season ====
Dwelley made his first NFL start during a Week 6 20–7 road victory over the Los Angeles Rams, playing fullback following an injury to starter Kyle Juszczyk. During a Week 11 36–26 victory over the Arizona Cardinals, Dwelley scored his first NFL touchdown on a four-yard reception from Jimmy Garoppolo. He also scored a second touchdown on a five-yard pass later in the game.

Dwelley finished his second professional season with 15 receptions for 91 yards and two touchdowns in 16 games and six starts. The 49ers reached Super Bowl LIV, but they lost to the Kansas City Chiefs by a score of 31–20.

==== 2020 season ====
On March 24, 2020, Dwelley was re-signed by the 49ers to a one-year, $660,000 contract. He finished the season with 19 receptions for 245 yards and a touchdown in 16 games and nine starts.

==== 2021 season ====
Dwelley signed a one-year contract extension with the 49ers on March 5, 2021. He finished the season with four receptions for 51 yards and a touchdown in 17 games and two starts.

==== 2022 season ====
On March 29, 2022, Dwelley re-signed with the 49ers. During a Week 8 31–14 road victory over the Rams, he had a career-long 56-yard reception in the fourth quarter. Dwelley finished the season with three receptions for 105 yards and a touchdown in 12 games and no starts.

==== 2023 season ====
Dwelley re-signed with the 49ers on March 20, 2023.

=== Atlanta Falcons ===
On May 13, 2024, Dwelley signed with the Atlanta Falcons.

=== San Francisco 49ers (second stint) ===
On May 2, 2025, Dwelley signed with the San Francisco 49ers on a one-year contract. He was released on August 15.

=== Detroit Lions ===
On September 16, 2025, Dwelley was signed to the Detroit Lions' practice squad. He was signed to the active roster on September 24. In 11 appearances (one start) for Detroit, Dwelley recorded two receptions for seven yards. On December 9, Dwelley was released by the Lions.

=== Carolina Panthers ===
On December 30, 2025, Dwelley was signed to the Carolina Panthers' practice squad.

== NFL career statistics ==
Legend
**Bold**	Career high

=== Regular season ===
Year	Team	Games		Receiving				
Year	Team	GP	GS	Rec	Yds	Avg	Lng	TD
2018	SF	11	0	2	14	7.0	8	0
2019	SF	16	6	15	91	6.1	25	**2**
2020	SF	16	9	**19**	**245**	12.9	36	1
2021	SF	17	2	4	51	12.8	21	1
2022	SF	12	0	3	105	**35.0**	**56**	1
2023	SF	12	0	1	12	12.0	12	0
2024	ATL	17	0	1	5	5.0	5	0
Career		101	17	45	523	11.6	56	5

=== Postseason ===
Year	Team	Games		Receiving				
Year	Team	GP	GS	Rec	Yds	Avg	Lng	TD
2019	SF	3	0	0	0	0.0	0	0
2021	SF	3	0	0	0	0.0	0	0
2022	SF	1	0	0	0	0.0	0	0
