= 2022 All-Pro Team =

Official list of the best NFL players in 2022

The 2022 All-Pro teams were named by the Associated Press (AP), Pro Football Writers of America (PFWA), and The Sporting News (TSN) for performance in the 2022 NFL season. Any player selected to the first-team of any of the teams can be described as an "All-Pro." The AP team, with first-team and second-team selections, was chosen by a national panel of fifty NFL writers and broadcasters. The Sporting News All-NFL team was voted on by NFL players and executives. The PFWA team is selected by its more than 300 national members who are accredited media members covering the NFL.

== Teams ==
Offense
Position	First team	Second team
Quarterback	Patrick Mahomes, Kansas City (AP, PFWA, TSN)	Jalen Hurts, Philadelphia (AP-2)
Running back	Josh Jacobs, Las Vegas (AP, PFWA); Nick Chubb, Cleveland (PFWA); Saquon Barkley, New York Giants (TSN); Derrick Henry, Tennessee (TSN)	Nick Chubb, Cleveland (AP-2)
Wide receiver	Justin Jefferson, Minnesota (AP, PFWA, TSN); Tyreek Hill, Miami (AP, PFWA); Davante Adams, Las Vegas (AP, TSN)	A. J. Brown, Philadelphia (AP-2); Stefon Diggs, Buffalo (AP-2); CeeDee Lamb, Dallas (AP-2)
Tight end	Travis Kelce, Kansas City (AP, PFWA, TSN)	George Kittle, San Francisco (AP-2)
Left tackle	Trent Williams, San Francisco (AP)	Andrew Thomas, New York Giants (AP-2)
Left guard	Joel Bitonio, Cleveland (AP)	Joe Thuney, Kansas City (AP-2)
Center	Jason Kelce, Philadelphia (AP, PFWA, TSN)	Creed Humphrey, Kansas City (AP-2)
Right guard	Zack Martin, Dallas (AP)	Chris Lindstrom, Atlanta (AP-2)
Right tackle	Lane Johnson, Philadelphia (AP)	Tristan Wirfs, Tampa Bay (AP-2)
Tackle	Lane Johnson, Philadelphia (PFWA, TSN); Trent Williams, San Francisco (PFWA, TSN)	
Guard	Joel Bitonio, Cleveland (PFWA, TSN); Zack Martin, Dallas (PFWA); Chris Lindstrom, Atlanta (TSN)	

Special teams
Position	First team	Second team
Placekicker	Daniel Carlson, Las Vegas (AP, PFWA); Jason Myers, Seattle (TSN)	Justin Tucker, Baltimore (AP-2)
Punter	Tommy Townsend, Kansas City (AP, PFWA); Ryan Stonehouse, Tennessee (TSN)	Ryan Stonehouse, Tennessee (AP-2)
Kick returner	Keisean Nixon, Green Bay (AP, PFWA); Kene Nwangwu, Minnesota (TSN)	Kene Nwangwu, Minnesota (AP-2)
Punt returner	Marcus Jones, New England (AP, PFWA, TSN)	Kalif Raymond, Detroit (AP-2)
Special teamer	Jeremy Reaves, Washington (AP, PFWA)	George Odum, San Francisco (AP-2)
Long snapper	Andrew DePaola, Minnesota (AP)	Nick Moore, Baltimore (AP-2)

Defense
Position	First team	Second team
Edge rusher	Nick Bosa, San Francisco (AP); Micah Parsons, Dallas (AP)	Haason Reddick, Philadelphia (AP-2); Myles Garrett, Cleveland (AP-2)
Defensive end	Nick Bosa, San Francisco (PFWA, TSN); Myles Garrett, Cleveland (PFWA, TSN)	
Interior lineman / defensive tackle	Chris Jones, Kansas City (AP, PFWA); Quinnen Williams, New York Jets (AP, PFWA); Jeffery Simmons, Tennessee (TSN); Aaron Donald, Los Angeles Rams (TSN)	Jeffery Simmons, Tennessee (AP-2); Dexter Lawrence, New York Giants (AP-2)
Linebacker	Fred Warner, San Francisco (AP, PFWA, TSN); Matt Milano, Buffalo (AP); Roquan Smith, Baltimore (AP); Micah Parsons, Dallas (TSN); Matthew Judon, New England (TSN)	Bobby Wagner, Los Angeles Rams (AP-2); C. J. Mosley, New York Jets (AP-2); Demario Davis, New Orleans (AP-2)
Outside linebacker	Micah Parsons, Dallas (PFWA); Haason Reddick, Philadelphia (PFWA)	
Cornerback	Sauce Gardner, New York Jets (AP, PFWA, TSN); Patrick Surtain II, Denver (AP, PFWA, TSN)	James Bradberry, Philadelphia (AP-2); Jaire Alexander, Green Bay (AP-2)
Safety	Minkah Fitzpatrick, Pittsburgh (AP, PFWA, TSN); Talanoa Hufanga, San Francisco (AP, PFWA); Derwin James, Los Angeles Chargers (TSN)	Derwin James, Los Angeles Chargers (AP-2); Justin Simmons, Denver (AP-2)

AP source:
PFWA source:
TSN source:

For this year's AP ballot, only Kansas City Chiefs tight end Travis Kelce and Minnesota Vikings wide receiver Justin Jefferson were unanimous selections, receiving all 50 first-place votes at their respective positions.

== Key ==
- AP = Associated Press first-team All-Pro
- AP-2 = Associated Press second-team All-Pro
- PFWA = Pro Football Writers Association All-NFL
- TSN = The Sporting News All-Pro

== Number of AP selections per team ==
American Football Conference
Team	Selections
Baltimore Ravens	3
Buffalo Bills	2
Cincinnati Bengals	0
Cleveland Browns	3
Denver Broncos	2
Houston Texans	0
Indianapolis Colts	0
Jacksonville Jaguars	0
Kansas City Chiefs	6
Las Vegas Raiders	3
Los Angeles Chargers	1
Miami Dolphins	1
New England Patriots	1
New York Jets	3
Pittsburgh Steelers	1
Tennessee Titans	2

National Football Conference
Team	Selections
Arizona Cardinals	0
Atlanta Falcons	1
Carolina Panthers	0
Chicago Bears	0
Dallas Cowboys	3
Detroit Lions	1
Green Bay Packers	2
Los Angeles Rams	1
Minnesota Vikings	3
New Orleans Saints	1
New York Giants	2
Philadelphia Eagles	6
San Francisco 49ers	6
Seattle Seahawks	0
Tampa Bay Buccaneers	1
Washington Commanders	1

== Position differences ==
PFWA and TSN do not separate the tackles and guards into more specific positions as the AP does. Additionally, PFWA and TSN formally select defensive ends as opposed to edge rushers, while PFWA selects outside linebackers separately from middle linebackers.
