= Tayler Hawkins =

American football player (born 1997)

No. 21 – St. Louis Battlehawks
- Position: Safety
- Roster status: Active

Personal information
- Born: December 27, 1997 (age 28); Palm Springs, California, U.S.
- Listed height: 6 ft 0 in (1.83 m)
- Listed weight: 207 lb (94 kg)

Career information
- High school: Palm Springs (CA)
- College: San Diego State (2016–2021)
- NFL draft: 2022: undrafted

Career history
- San Francisco 49ers (2022–2023); DC Defenders (2025); St. Louis Battlehawks (2026–present)

Awards and highlights
- UFL champion (2025)

Career NFL statistics as of 2023
- Total tackles: 4
- Interceptions: 1
- Stats at Pro Football Reference

Tayler Colby Hawkins (born December 27, 1997) is an American professional football safety for the St. Louis Battlehawks of the United Football League (UFL). He played college football for the San Diego State Aztecs. He also played for the San Francisco 49ers of the National Football League (NFL).

== Early life ==
Hawkins was born on December 27, 1997, in Palm Springs, California. His mother died when he was 18 months old and he and his twin brother lived with their grandmother growing up. He and his twin, Tyler, both became top football players at Palm Springs High School, with Tayler being a three-time first-team all-league choice while playing wide receiver, defensive back and punter.

Also a two-time first-team All-CIF selection, Hawkins had 94 receptions for 1,915 yards and 25 touchdowns in his last two years along with 133 tackles, 14 pass deflections and nine interceptions in three years. He helped his team win 24-of-27 games in his last two seasons while they won the CIF championship in 2015. He committed to play college football for the San Diego State Aztecs along with Palm Springs teammate Trenton Thompson, while his brother committed to the Sacramento State Hornets.

== College career ==
Hawkins redshirted as a true freshman at San Diego State in 2016. He appeared in 10 games during the 2017 season and recorded five tackles. He had 13 games played, five as a starter, in the 2018 season, totaling 35 tackles and five pass breakups. He then started five of 13 games in 2019 and had 30 tackles and three tackles-for-loss. He was named honorable mention All-Mountain West Conference (MWC) as a senior in 2020. He opted to return for a final season in 2021, after having been granted extra eligibility due to the COVID-19 pandemic. Hawkins was named second-team all-conference in 2021 and had 62 tackles, 13 pass breakups and two interceptions while being ranked the second-best coverage defensive back nationally by Pro Football Focus (PFF); he was also chosen to PFF's Mountain West Team of the Year.

== Professional career ==
Pre-draft measurables
Height	Weight	Arm length	Hand span	Wingspan	40-yard dash	10-yard split	20-yard split	20-yard shuttle	Three-cone drill	Vertical jump	Broad jump	Bench press
6 ft 0 in (1.83 m)	203 lb (92 kg)	30 1/2 in (0.77 m)	9 3/8 in (0.24 m)	6 ft 1 1/8 in (1.86 m)	4.53 s	1.56 s	2.63 s	4.34 s	7.21 s	36.5 in (0.93 m)	9 ft 8 in (2.95 m)	14 reps
All values from Pro Day

=== San Francisco 49ers ===
After going unselected in the 2022 NFL draft, Hawkins was signed by the San Francisco 49ers as an undrafted free agent. He was released at the final roster cuts and subsequently re-signed to the practice squad. Hawkins signed a reserve/future contract with San Francisco after the season on January 31, 2023. He was placed on injured reserve on August 29, which was to end his season. On September 6, he was waived from injured reserve. He was re-signed to the practice squad on October 24. He was elevated to the active roster for the team's season finale against the Los Angeles Rams, making his NFL debut in the game while recording an interception.

Hawkins signed a reserve/future contract with San Francisco on February 13, 2024. Hawkins was waived by the 49ers with an injury settlement on August 22.

=== DC Defenders ===
On December 4, 2024, Hawkins signed with the DC Defenders of the United Football League (UFL).

=== St. Louis Battlehawks ===
On January 29, 2026, Hawkins signed with the St. Louis Battlehawks of the United Football League (UFL).
