= Jordan Willis (American football) =

American football player (born 1995)

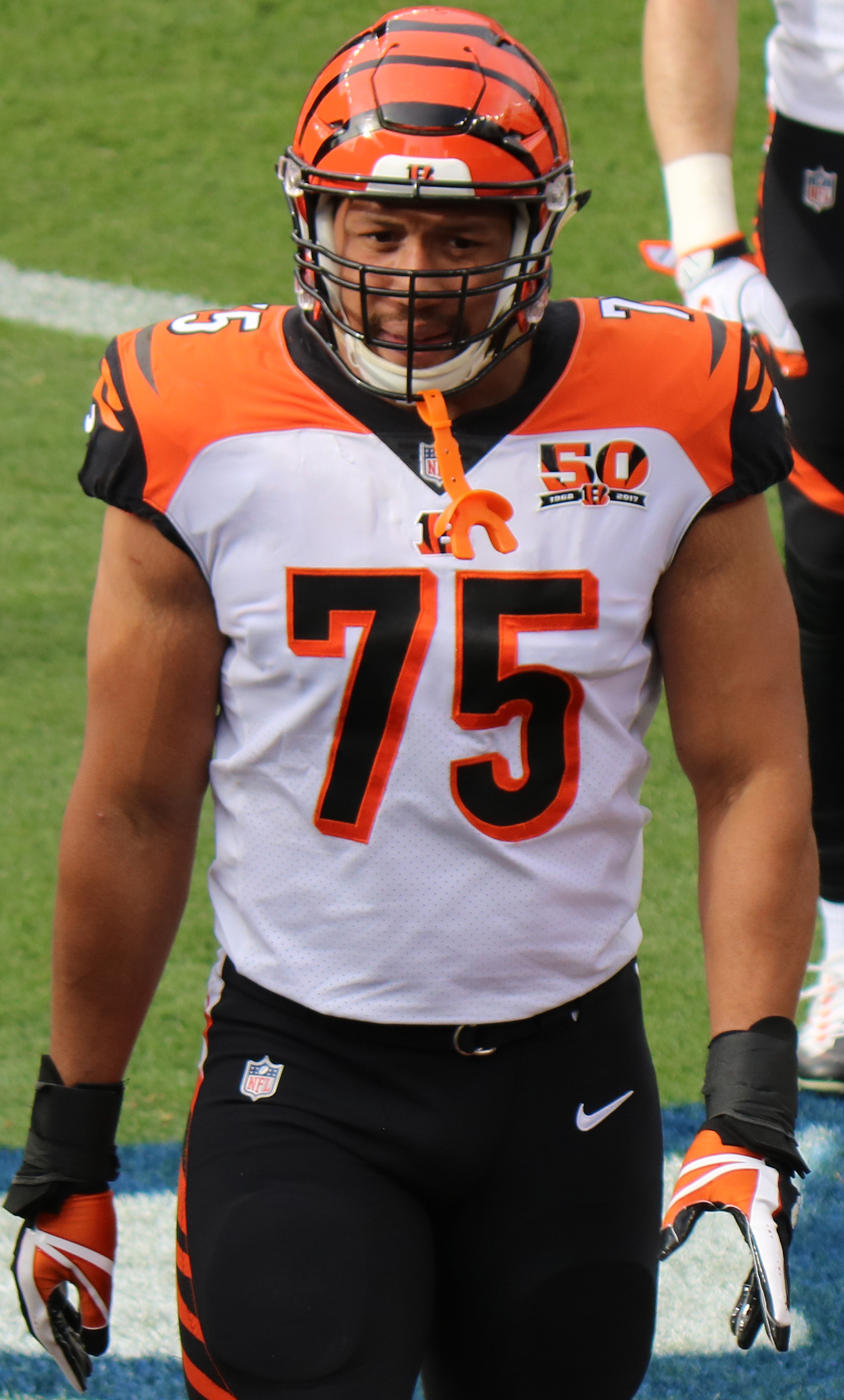
- Willis with the Cincinnati Bengals in 2017

No. 75, 60, 53, 78, 94
- Position: Defensive end

Personal information
- Born: May 2, 1995 (age 31); San Diego, California, U.S.
- Listed height: 6 ft 4 in (1.93 m)
- Listed weight: 270 lb (122 kg)

Career information
- High school: Rockhurst (Kansas City, Missouri)
- College: Kansas State (2013–2016)
- NFL draft: 2017: 3rd round, 73rd overall pick

Career history
- Cincinnati Bengals (2017–2019); New York Jets (2019–2020); San Francisco 49ers (2020–2022); Las Vegas Raiders (2023)*; New Orleans Saints (2023)*
- * Offseason or practice squad member only

Awards and highlights
- Big 12 Defensive Player of the Year (2016); Big 12 Defensive Lineman of the Year (2016); First team All-Big 12 (2016)

Career NFL statistics
- Total tackles: 92
- Sacks: 10.5
- Forced fumbles: 3
- Fumble recoveries: 3
- Pass deflections: 1
- Stats at Pro Football Reference

Jordan Johnathan Willis (born May 2, 1995) is an American former professional football player who was a defensive end in the National Football League (NFL). He played college football for the Kansas State Wildcats and was selected by the Cincinnati Bengals in the third round of the 2017 NFL draft. He was also a member of the New York Jets, San Francisco 49ers, Las Vegas Raiders and New Orleans Saints.

== Early life ==
Willis attended Rockhurst High School in Kansas City, Missouri. He had 58 tackles and nine sacks as a senior and 60 tackles and 13 sacks as a junior. Willis also served as the student body president as a senior. He committed to Kansas State University to play college football.

== College career ==
As a true freshman at Kansas State in 2013, Willis played in nine games and had one sack. As a sophomore in 2014, he started all 13 games and had 26 tackles and 4.5 sacks. As a junior in 2015, Willis again started all 13 games, recording 36 tackles and 9.5 sacks. As a senior, he was named the Big 12 Defensive Player of the Year after recording 52 tackles and 11.5 sacks.

== Professional career ==
Pre-draft measurables
| Height | Weight | Arm length | Hand span | 40-yard dash | 10-yard split | 20-yard split | 20-yard shuttle | Three-cone drill | Vertical jump | Broad jump | Bench press |
|---|---|---|---|---|---|---|---|---|---|---|---|
| 6 ft 3 3/4 in (1.92 m) | 255 lb (116 kg) | 33 1/2 in (0.85 m) | 9 7/8 in (0.25 m) | 4.53 s | 1.57 s | 2.59 s | 4.28 s | 6.85 s | 39.0 in (0.99 m) | 10 ft 5 in (3.18 m) | 24 reps |
All values from NFL Combine

=== Cincinnati Bengals ===
Willis was selected by the Cincinnati Bengals in the third round, 73rd overall, in the 2017 NFL draft.

On September 10, 2019, Willis was released by the Bengals.

=== New York Jets ===
On September 11, 2019, Willis was claimed off waivers by the New York Jets.

=== San Francisco 49ers ===
On October 27, 2020, Willis was traded to the San Francisco 49ers for a sixth-round pick in 2022. The Jets also sent their 2021 seventh-round pick to the 49ers. Willis was placed on the injured reserve/COVID-19 list by the team on November 23, 2020, and activated on December 2. On January 1, 2021, Willis was placed on injured reserve. He finished the season with a career-high 2.5 sacks.

Willis re-signed with the 49ers on a one-year contract on March 23, 2021. On June 17, Willis was suspended for the first six games of the 2021 season after violating the NFL’s policy on performance-enhancing substances.

On January 22, 2022, in an NFC Divisional Round against the Green Bay Packers at Lambeau Field, with wind chill approaching zero degrees, snow falling, and five minutes remaining in the game, Willis blocked a critical punt by Corey Bojorquez, which was returned for the 49ers' sole touchdown of the game by safety Talanoa Hufanga. That play tied the game 10–10 and allowed the 49ers to win with a field goal from Robbie Gould. For that effort, Jordan was awarded a game ball by 49ers head coach Kyle Shanahan.

On March 23, 2022, Willis re-signed with the 49ers. Willis was released during final roster cuts on August 30, but re–signed with the team the following day. He was placed on injured reserve on September 14, 2022. He was activated on November 12.

=== Las Vegas Raiders ===
On March 20, 2023, Willis signed with the Las Vegas Raiders. He was released on August 29, 2023. On September 11, 2023, Willis signed with the team’s practice squad, but was released five days later.

=== New Orleans Saints ===
On November 6, 2023, Willis was signed to the practice squad of the New Orleans Saints. He was released on November 14.
