= Kemoko Turay =

American football player (born 1995)

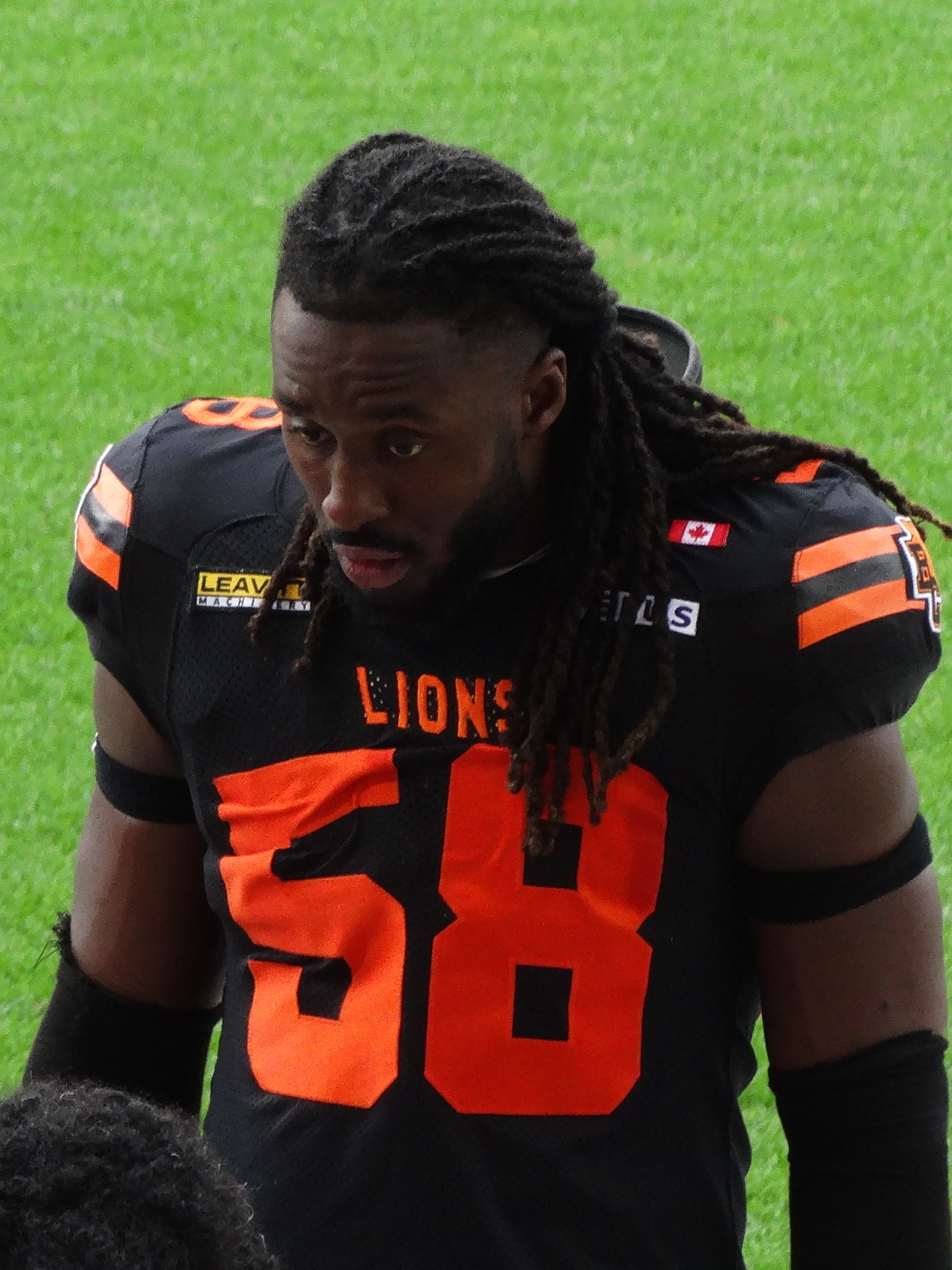
- Turay with the BC Lions in 2025

Profile
- Position: Linebacker/Defensive lineman

Personal information
- Born: July 11, 1995 (age 31); Montclair, New Jersey, U.S.
- Listed height: 6 ft 5 in (1.96 m)
- Listed weight: 248 lb (112 kg)

Career information
- High school: Barringer (Newark, New Jersey)
- College: Rutgers
- NFL draft: 2018: 2nd round, 52nd overall pick

Career history
- Indianapolis Colts (2018–2021); San Francisco 49ers (2022); Atlanta Falcons (2023)*; Carolina Panthers (2024)*; St. Louis Battlehawks (2025)*; BC Lions (2025)
- * Offseason or practice squad member only

Awards and highlights
- Freshman All-American (2014)

Career NFL statistics
- Total tackles: 34
- Sacks: 12.0
- Forced fumbles: 2
- Fumble recoveries: 1
- Stats at Pro Football Reference

Kemoko Turay (born July 11, 1995) is an American professional football linebacker/defensive lineman. He played college football for the Rutgers Scarlet Knights and was selected by the Indianapolis Colts in the second round of the 2018 NFL draft.

== Early life ==
Turay was born in Montclair, New Jersey. His father is from Guinea, while his mother is from the Ivory Coast.

== College career ==
Turay attended and played college football at Rutgers under head coaches Kyle Flood and Chris Ash. Turay had an impressive redshirted freshman season, with 24 tackles, 8 tackles for loss, and 7.5 sacks despite not starting any games. After this season, he was named to the Freshman All-American team. After his senior season, Turay was invited to the 2018 Senior Bowl.

== Professional career ==
=== Pre-draft ===
After his senior season, Turay was invited to the 2018 NFL Combine.

Pre-draft measurables
Height	Weight	Arm length	Hand span	Wingspan	40-yard dash	10-yard split	20-yard split	Bench press
6 ft 4 5/8 in (1.95 m)	253 lb (115 kg)	33 3/8 in (0.85 m)	9 5/8 in (0.24 m)	6 ft 8 1/8 in (2.04 m)	4.65 s	1.62 s	2.72 s	18 reps
All values from NFL Combine/Pro Day

=== Indianapolis Colts ===
Turay was drafted by the Indianapolis Colts in the second round, 52nd overall, of the 2018 NFL draft. In Week 3, against the Philadelphia Eagles, he recorded 1.5 sacks for the first ones of his professional career.

In Week 5 of the 2019 season, Turay suffered a broken ankle and was ruled out the rest of the season. He was placed on injured reserve on October 14, 2019.

Turay was placed on the active/physically unable to perform (PUP) list at the start of training camp on July 28, 2020, and was placed on reserve/PUP to start the season. He was activated on November 17, 2020.

=== San Francisco 49ers ===
On April 14, 2022, Turay signed a one-year contract with the San Francisco 49ers. He was released on August 30, 2022, and signed to the practice squad the next day. He was promoted to the active roster on September 14, 2022. He was released on November 26 and re-signed to the practice squad.

=== Atlanta Falcons ===
On July 28, 2023, Turay signed with the Atlanta Falcons. He was released on August 29, 2023, and re-signed to the practice squad. He was released on September 18, 2023.

=== Carolina Panthers ===
On July 26, 2024, Turay signed with the Carolina Panthers. However, after suffering an injury he was placed on injured reserve on August 5. Turay was then released off injured reserve on August 14.

=== St. Louis Battlehawks ===
On October 24, 2024, Turay signed with the St. Louis Battlehawks of the UFL. He was released on March 20, 2025.

=== BC Lions ===
On April 22, 2025, Turay signed as a defensive lineman with the BC Lions of the Canadian Football League (CFL). On July 9, 2025, Turay was handed a 1-game suspension by the CFL, after he incited in a post-game brawl with opposing players, following a Lions' road victory over the Montreal Alouettes four days prior. On July 16, 2025, Turay's suspension was lifted and he rejoined the Lions' active roster. On September 11, 2025, Turay was placed on the Lions' 1-game injured list. He rejoined the active roster on September 18, 2025. He was released on September 23, 2025.
