= Jason Poe =

American football player (born 1998)

Profile
- Position: Offensive guard

Personal information
- Born: July 27, 1998 (age 28); Fitzgerald, Georgia, U.S.
- Listed height: 6 ft 1 in (1.85 m)
- Listed weight: 300 lb (136 kg)

Career information
- High school: Fitzgerald (GA)
- College: Hutchinson CC (2017); Lenoir–Rhyne (2018–2020); Mercer (2021)
- NFL draft: 2022: undrafted

Career history
- San Francisco 49ers (2022–2023)*; New York Jets (2023)*; Philadelphia Eagles (2024)*; DC Defenders (2025)*
- * Offseason or practice squad member only
- Stats at Pro Football Reference

Jason Poe (born July 27, 1998) is an American professional football offensive guard. He played college football at Hutchinson Community College, Lenoir–Rhyne and Mercer.

== Early life ==
Poe was born on July 27, 1998, in Fitzgerald, Georgia, a town of under 10,000 people. He attended Fitzgerald High School and tried out for the football team as a freshman, after having never before played organized sports.

His coach initially thought of him as one of the worst players he had ever seen and suggested Poe not play, saying "Jason got to us as a ninth-grader at Fitzgerald and was literally one of the worst football players that I've ever seen. It was just horrendous, horrendous. And we thought the kid was really going to wind up getting hurt. We tried to convince him to just be a manager because he was so bad. We thought he'd be more valuable to us as a manager. But he wanted to play. And he stuck it out." He saw limited action on the junior varsity team for his first two years, but afterwards saw more time on the varsity as a guard. He was a zero-star recruit and committed to Hutchinson Community College.

== College career ==
Poe spent one year at Hutchinson, playing fullback in 2017 before transferring to play for the Division II Lenoir–Rhyne Bears. He changed to being an offensive lineman with the Bears. In 2018 with Lenoir–Rhyne, he played in 13 games while helping them rank top-10 nationally in rushing yards per game and scoring offense, being named a second-team All-American, first-team all-conference and all-region, and the recipient of the Jacobs Blocking Trophy for best blocker in the conference. Poe started every game in 2019 and repeated as the Jacobs Blocking Trophy winner, being also named a first-team All-American, first-team all-conference and all-region despite playing through injury. He sat out the 2020 season due to the COVID-19 pandemic, afterwards transferring to Mercer for his final season. Poe was named first-team all-conference in 2021.

Off the field, Poe maintained high grades in school, earning an associate's degree in one year, a bachelor's degree (in information technology) in two, and later a Information technology master's degree with a perfect 4.0 GPA. He also received an SAP certificate, becoming a recognized software technology consultant.

== Professional career ==
Pre-draft measurables
Height	Weight	Arm length	Hand span	40-yard dash	10-yard split	20-yard split	20-yard shuttle	Three-cone drill	Vertical jump	Broad jump	Bench press
6 ft 0 5/8 in (1.84 m)	300 lb (136 kg)	32 in (0.81 m)	10 3/4 in (0.27 m)	4.95 s	1.75 s	2.94 s	4.52 s	7.52 s	31.5 in (0.80 m)	9 ft 3 in (2.82 m)	34 reps
All values from Pro Day

Poe was not invited to the NFL Scouting Combine, but at his pro day posted impressive numbers, including a 40-yard dash time that would have placed second and a bench press total that would have been first. There were concerns made, however, about his size; had he been invited to the combine, he would have been the shortest lineman there (6 ft 1 in) and the sixth-lightest (300 lb), as well as had the shortest arm length, a key measurement for players at his position.

=== San Francisco 49ers ===
Although some projected Poe to be chosen in the 2022 NFL draft, he went unselected; afterwards, he was signed by the San Francisco 49ers as an undrafted free agent. Poe became the first player from Mercer to be signed since the program had been revived in 2013. He impressed in training camp and was considered to have a chance to make the team, but ultimately was released at the final roster cuts on August 30, subsequently being re-signed to the practice squad. He ended up spending the entire season on the practice squad, seeing no playing time. Poe signed a reserve/future contract on January 31, 2023. On August 29, 2023, Poe was waived by the 49ers.

=== New York Jets ===
On August 31, 2023, Poe was signed to the New York Jets practice squad. Poe was released by the Jets on November 6, 2023.

=== Philadelphia Eagles ===
On January 18, 2024, Poe signed a reserve/future contract with the Philadelphia Eagles. He was waived on August 5. He was re-signed on August 21, but waived a week later.

=== DC Defenders ===
On December 12, 2024, Poe signed with the DC Defenders of the United Football League (UFL). He was released on February 14, 2025.
