= George Odum =

American football player (born 1993)

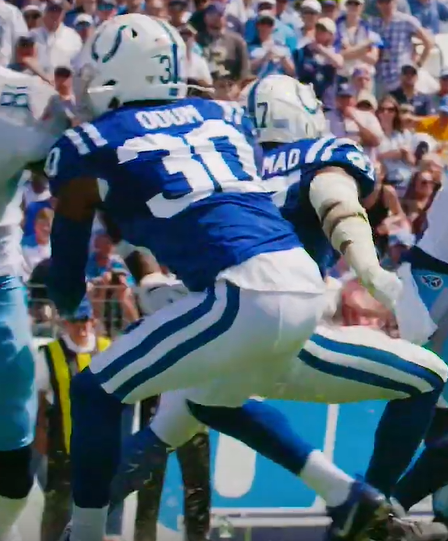
- Odum with the Indianapolis Colts in 2019

No. 36 – Houston Texans
- Position: Safety
- Roster status: Practice squad

Personal information
- Born: November 3, 1993 (age 33); Millington, Tennessee, U.S.
- Listed height: 6 ft 1 in (1.85 m)
- Listed weight: 200 lb (91 kg)

Career information
- High school: Millington Central
- College: Central Arkansas (2013–2017)
- NFL draft: 2018: undrafted

Career history
- Indianapolis Colts (2018–2021); San Francisco 49ers (2022–2024); Indianapolis Colts (2025); Houston Texans (2026–present)

Awards and highlights
- First-team All-Pro (2020); Second-team All-Pro (2022); FCS All-American (2017); 2× first-team All-SLC (2016, 2017)

Career NFL statistics as of 2025
- Total tackles: 204
- Forced fumbles: 4
- Fumble recoveries: 2
- Pass deflections: 9
- Interceptions: 3
- Stats at Pro Football Reference

George Odum (born November 3, 1993) is an American professional football safety and special teamer for the Houston Texans of the National Football League (NFL). He played college football for the Central Arkansas Bears before signing with the Indianapolis Colts as an undrafted free agent in 2018. Odum was named to the 2020 and 2022 All-Pro Team as a special teamer.

== Early life ==
Odum was born and raised in Millington, Tennessee, and attended Millington Central High School, where he was a star athlete both in football and track. As a senior, he was an All-Region selection at defensive back and punt returner and participated in the 2012 Tennessee vs. Kentucky National Guard and AutoZone Liberty Bowl All-Star Games.

== College career ==
Odum played five seasons for the Central Arkansas Bears, redshirting his true freshman season. He played both linebacker and safety and finished fourth in school history with 350 career tackles. He was named first-team All-Southland Conference after making 86 tackles (58 solo), 7.5 tackles for loss, 2.5 sacks, four passes defensed, one interception (returned for a touchdown), four forced fumbles, two fumble recoveries and two blocked kick. As a senior, Odum led the Bears in tackles and was named Southland Defensive Player of the Year and a consensus All-America selection after recording 120 tackles (78 solo), 8.0 tackles for loss, 4.0 sacks, two passes defensed, and one forced fumble.

== Professional career ==
Pre-draft measurables
| Height | Weight | Arm length | Hand span | Wingspan | 40-yard dash | 10-yard split | 20-yard split | 20-yard shuttle | Three-cone drill | Vertical jump | Broad jump | Bench press |
|---|---|---|---|---|---|---|---|---|---|---|---|---|
| 6 ft 1 in (1.85 m) | 201 lb (91 kg) | 32 3/8 in (0.82 m) | 9 1/2 in (0.24 m) | 6 ft 5 5/8 in (1.97 m) | 4.45 s | 1.53 s | 2.68 s | 4.19 s | 7.00 s | 33.5 in (0.85 m) | 9 ft 10 in (3.00 m) | 22 reps |
All values from Pro Day

=== Indianapolis Colts (first stint) ===
Odum was signed by the Indianapolis Colts as an undrafted free agent on May 1, 2018, and made the team out of training camp. Odum made his NFL debut on September 9, 2018, against the Cincinnati Bengals, playing on special teams. Odum made his first career start on November 18, 2018, after an injury to safety Malik Hooker in a 38–10 win against the Tennessee Titans and made 6 tackles, including one for a loss. Odum recorded his first career interception by picking off a pass from Dallas Cowboys quarterback Dak Prescott in a 23–0 win on December 16, 2018. In his rookie season, Odum played in all 16 games for the Colts (two starts) with 36 total tackles, including one for loss, an interception and two passes defended.

In 2019, Odum again played in all 16 of the Colts' games and recorded 37 tackles with two forced fumbles and a fumble recovery. Odum made one start during the season against the Kansas City Chiefs, making six tackles and forcing a fumble in a 19–13 victory.

Odum saw only 25 total snaps on defense in 2020, but led the NFL with 20 special teams tackles and was named first-team All-Pro as a special teamer. The Colts placed a restricted free agent tender on Odum on March 17, 2021. He signed the one-year contract on April 19.

In 2021, Odum saw more playing time on defensive due to injuries in the Colts' secondary. He started seven games and played 43% of the team's total defensive snaps during the season. Odum finished the year with 55 total tackles, two passes defended, and one interception with a forced fumble and a fumble recovery. Odum became an unrestricted free agent after the season ended.

=== San Francisco 49ers ===
On March 22, 2022, Odum signed a three-year contract with the San Francisco 49ers. After the season, he was named an All–Pro for the second time. He was placed on injured reserve on November 27, 2023. He was activated on January 20, 2024.

On March 13, 2024, Odum signed a two-year contract extension through the 2026 season. On December 7, Odum was placed on injured reserve. On July 19, 2025, Odum was released by the 49ers, and it was revealed that he had undergone offseason elbow surgery.

=== Indianapolis Colts (second stint) ===
On November 18, 2025, Odum signed with the Indianapolis Colts' practice squad. On November 25, he was signed to the 53-man roster.

=== Houston Texans ===
On August 24, 2026, Odum signed with the Houston Texans. Odum was released by Houston on August 30 as a part of final roster cuts; he was re-signed to the team's practice squad the next day.
