= 2021 San Francisco 49ers season =

American football team season

- 49ers 75th anniversary logo
- Owner: Jed York
- General manager: John Lynch
- Head coach: Kyle Shanahan
- Offensive coordinator: Mike McDaniel
- Defensive coordinator: DeMeco Ryans
- Home stadium: Levi's Stadium

Results
- Record: 10–7
- Division place: 3rd NFC West
- Playoffs: Won Wild Card Playoffs (at Cowboys) 23–17; Won Divisional Playoffs (at Packers) 13–10; Lost NFC Championship (at Rams) 17–20
- All-Pros: 2: WR Deebo Samuel (1st team); LT Trent Williams (1st team)
- Pro Bowlers: 7: FB Kyle Juszczyk; WR Deebo Samuel; TE George Kittle; T Trent Williams; G Laken Tomlinson; C Alex Mack; DE Nick Bosa

Uniform
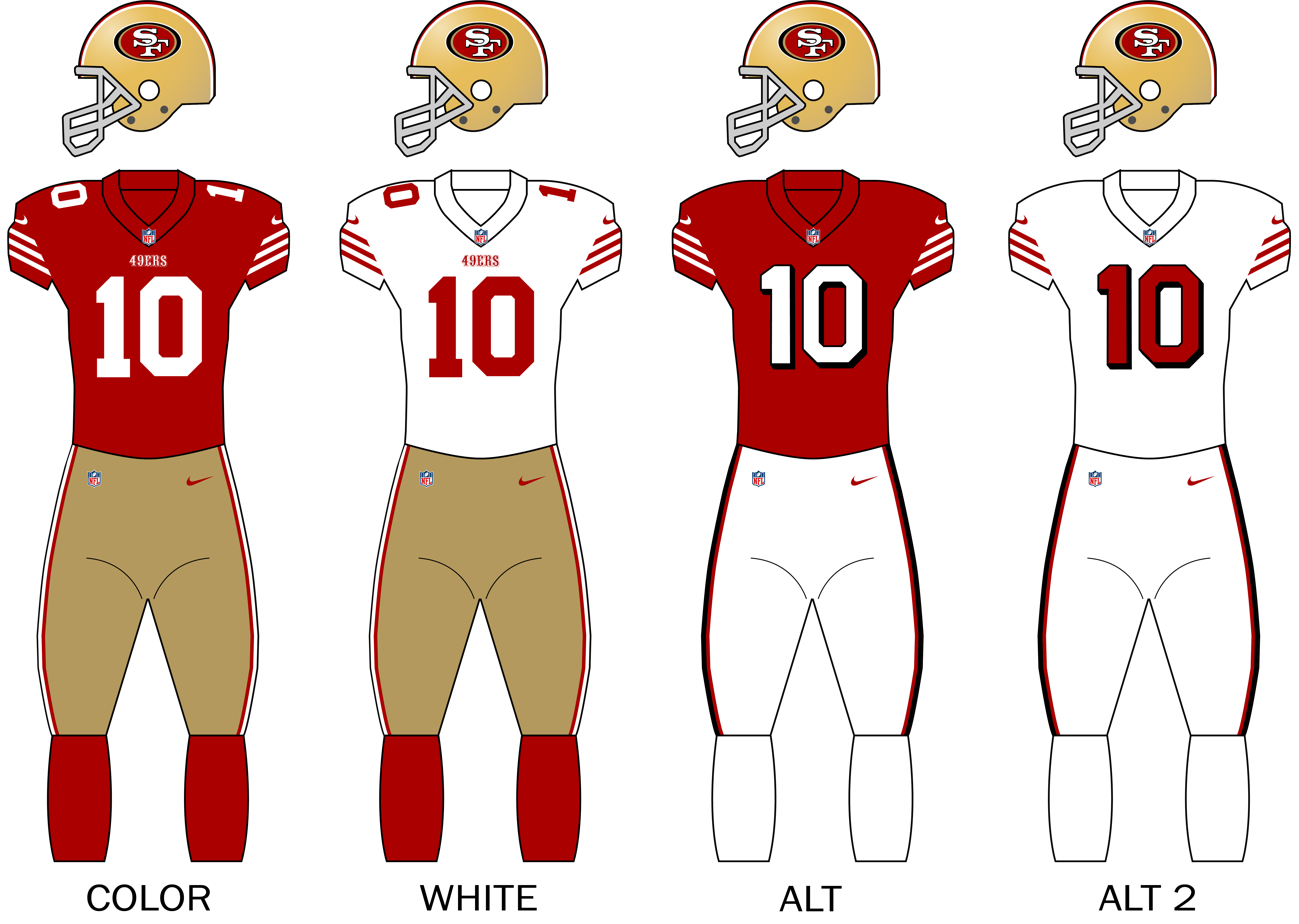

The 2021 season was the San Francisco 49ers' 72nd season in the National Football League (NFL), their 76th overall and their fifth under the head coach/general manager tandem of Kyle Shanahan and John Lynch. In honor of the 75th anniversary of the team's founding in 1946, the 49ers introduced a commemorative logo to be used during this season.

They improved from their 6–10 record from the previous year and they returned to the playoffs after a one-year absence. Despite starting 2–0, they would lose 4 consecutive games. After an embarrassing Week 9 loss to an injury depleted Arizona Cardinals, the 49ers had a disappointing 3–5 record, but they would rebound and end the season winning 7 of their last 9 games, including a dramatic Week 18 win over the Los Angeles Rams in which the 49ers fought back from a 17–0 deficit to win 27–24 in overtime, thus allowing them to sneak into the playoffs. During the season, the 49ers showcased a well rounded team, finishing top 10 in both total offense and total defense. The offense averaged 376 yards a game, good for 8th in the league, while averaging 25.1 points a game. The defense was even better, giving up just 310 yards a game, good for 3rd overall, averaging 21.5 points a game. This included the 6th best pass defense and 7th best rush defense. The defense also generated 48 sacks during the season, 5th best in the league.

In the wild-card round, the 49ers upset the Dallas Cowboys 23–17. They would then upset the #1 seeded Green Bay Packers 13–10 in the divisional round, thus advancing to the NFC Championship for the second time in three years. However, they lost to their division rival and eventual Super Bowl champion Los Angeles Rams 20–17.

== Offseason ==
=== Roster changes ===
==== Free agency ====
The 49ers entered free agency with the following:

Position	Player	Free agency tag	Date Signed	2021 Team	Notes
OT	Trent Williams	UFA	March 23, 2021	San Francisco 49ers	Signed six-year contract
CB	Richard Sherman	UFA	September 29, 2021	Tampa Bay Buccaneers	Signed one-year contract
DE	Solomon Thomas	UFA	March 19, 2021	Las Vegas Raiders	Signed one-year contract
FS	Jaquiski Tartt	UFA	March 22, 2021	San Francisco 49ers	Signed one-year contract
FB	Kyle Juszczyk	UFA	March 15, 2021	San Francisco 49ers	Signed five-year contract
RB	Tevin Coleman	UFA	March 25, 2021	New York Jets	Signed one-year contract
WR	Kendrick Bourne	UFA	March 19, 2021	New England Patriots	Signed three-year contract
CB	K'Waun Williams	UFA	March 26, 2021	San Francisco 49ers	Signed one-year contract
OT	Tom Compton	UFA	April 28, 2021	San Francisco 49ers	Signed one-year contract
DE	Ronald Blair	UFA	June 1, 2021	New York Jets	Signed one-year contract
C	Ben Garland	UFA			
DE	Kerry Hyder	UFA	March 25, 2021	Seattle Seahawks	Signed three-year contract
DE	Ezekiel Ansah	UFA			
RB	Jerick McKinnon	UFA	May 1, 2021	Kansas City Chiefs	Signed one-year contract
C	Tony Bergstrom	UFA			
CB	Jason Verrett	UFA	April 1, 2021	San Francisco 49ers	Signed one-year contract
CB	Ahkello Witherspoon	UFA	March 19, 2021	Seattle Seahawks	Signed one-year contract
CB	Dontae Johnson	UFA	March 19, 2021	San Francisco 49ers	Signed one-year contract
C	Hroniss Grasu	UFA			
DE	Dion Jordan	UFA			
CB	Jamar Taylor	UFA			
DE	Jordan Willis	UFA	March 23, 2021	San Francisco 49ers	Signed one-year contract
QB	C. J. Beathard	UFA	March 24, 2021	Jacksonville Jaguars	Signed two-year contract
LB	Joe Walker	UFA	May 19, 2021	Washington Football Team	
QB	Nick Mullens	RFA	June 14, 2021	Philadelphia Eagles	Signed one-year contract
TE	Ross Dwelley	RFA	March 5, 2021	San Francisco 49ers	Signed one-year contract
LS	Taybor Pepper	RFA	February 4, 2021	San Francisco 49ers	Signed two-year contract
RB	Jeff Wilson	RFA	January 26, 2021	San Francisco 49ers	Signed one-year contract
QB	Josh Rosen	ERFA	February 8, 2021	San Francisco 49ers	Signed one-year contract
CB	Emmanuel Moseley	ERFA	March 15, 2021	San Francisco 49ers	Signed two-year contract
OT	Daniel Brunskill	ERFA	April 13, 2021	San Francisco 49ers	Signed one-year contract
CB	Ken Webster	ERFA	January 21, 2021	San Francisco 49ers	Signed one-year contract
WR	River Cracraft	ERFA	February 22, 2021	San Francisco 49ers	Signed one-year contract
WR	Trent Taylor	UFA	May 17, 2021	Cincinnati Bengals	Signed one-year contract
DT	D. J. Jones	UFA	March 22, 2021	San Francisco 49ers	Signed one-year contract
S	Marcell Harris	RFA	March 5, 2021	San Francisco 49ers	Signed one-year contract
RB	Austin Walter	ERFA	February 8, 2021	San Francisco 49ers	Signed one-year contract
RFA: Restricted free agent, UFA: Unrestricted free agent, ERFA: Exclusive rights free agent LEGEND – Light green background indicates a player has been re-signed by the 49ers. – Light red background indicates a player has departed the 49ers.

==== Signings ====
Position	Player	2020 Team	Date signed	Notes
CB	Mark Fields		October 13, 2020	Claimed off waivers
CB	Briean Boddy-Calhoun		March 17, 2021	Signed one-year contract
TE	Daniel Helm		March 17, 2021	Signed one-year contract
C	Alex Mack	Atlanta Falcons	March 18, 2021	Signed three-year contract
LB	Samson Ebukam	Los Angeles Rams	March 18, 2021	Signed two-year contract
WR	Trent Sherfield	Arizona Cardinals	March 19, 2021	Signed one-year contract
S	Tavon Wilson	Indianapolis Colts	March 22, 2021	Signed one-year contract
DT	Zach Kerr	Carolina Panthers	March 23, 2021	Signed one-year contract
LB	Nathan Gerry	Philadelphia Eagles	March 29, 2021	Signed one-year contract
WR	Mohamed Sanu	Detroit Lions	March 30, 2021	Signed one-year contract
QB	Nate Sudfeld	Philadelphia Eagles	April 7, 2021	Signed one-year contract
RB	Wayne Gallman	New York Giants	April 21, 2021	Signed one-year contract
DT	Maurice Hurst Jr.	Las Vegas Raiders	April 23, 2021	Signed one-year contract
DE	Arden Key	Las Vegas Raiders	April 23, 2021	Signed one-year contract
WR	Marqise Lee	New England Patriots	May 17, 2021	Signed one-year contract
WR	Bennie Fowler	New Orleans Saints	May 21, 2021	Signed one-year contract
WR	Andy Jones		June 1, 2021	Signed one-year contract
LB	James Burgess	Green Bay Packers	June 2, 2021	Signed one-year contract
TE	MyCole Pruitt	Tennessee Titans	June 2, 2021	Signed one-year contract
S	Tony Jefferson		June 7, 2021	Signed one-year contract
OG	Senio Kelemete	Houston Texans	June 11, 2021	Signed one-year contract
WR	Nsimba Webster	Los Angeles Rams	June 21, 2021	claimed off waivers
DE	Eddie Yarbrough	Minnesota Vikings	July 27, 2021	Signed one-year contract
DE	Anthony Zettel	New Orleans Saints	July 27, 2021	Signed one-year contract
TE	Jordan Matthews		July 31, 2021	Signed one-year contract
TE	Joshua Perkins		August 4, 2021	Signed one-year contract
CB	B. W. Webb		August 4, 2021	Signed one-year contract
LB	Davin Bellamy		August 6, 2021	Signed one-year contract
LB	Shilique Calhoun	New England Patriots	August 10, 2021	Signed one-year contract
CB	Alexander Myres	Detroit Lions	August 10, 2021	Signed one-year contract
LB	Donald Payne		August 11, 2021	Signed one-year contract
S	Ha Ha Clinton-Dix		August 12, 2021	Signed one-year contract
DT	Eddie Vanderdoes	Houston Texans	August 12, 2021	Signed one-year contract
LB	Mychal Kendricks		August 16, 2021	Signed one-year contract
CB	Davontae Harris	Baltimore Ravens	August 17, 2021	Claimed off waivers
OT	Corbin Kaufusi		August 27, 2021	Signed one-year contract
WR	River Cracraft		August 28, 2021	Signed one-year contract
CB	Josh Norman	Buffalo Bills	September 6, 2021	Signed one-year contract
CB	Dre Kirkpatrick	Arizona Cardinals	September 14, 2021	Signed one-year contract
RB	Trenton Cannon		September 15, 2021	Claimed off waivers

Indicates that the player was a free agent at the end of his respective team's 2020 season.

==== Departures ====
Position	Player	Date	Notes
DE	Ronald Blair	March 12, 2021	Released
WR	Marquise Goodwin	March 17, 2021	Released
TE	Chase Harrell	April 13, 2021	Waived
TE	Jordan Reed	April 20, 2021	Retired
CB	Adonis Alexander	May 4, 2021	Waived
WR	Matt Cole	May 4, 2021	Waived
S	Chris Edwards	May 4, 2021	Waived
RB	Austin Walter	May 13, 2021	Waived
WR	Austin Proehl	May 17, 2021	Waived
WR	Marqise Lee	May 21, 2021	Waived
TE	Daniel Helm	June 1, 2021	Waived
QB	Josh Johnson	June 1, 2021	Waived
C	Weston Richburg	June 2, 2021	Retired
CB	Briean Boddy-Calhoun	June 7, 2021	Waived
OG	Justin Skule	June 11, 2021	Waived
LB	Nathan Gerry	July 6, 2021	Waived
DE	Daeshon Hall	July 26, 2021	Released
WR	Andy Jones	July 27, 2021	Waived
WR	Bennie Fowler	July 31, 2021	Released
CB	Tim Harris	August 4, 2021	Waived
DE	Anthony Zettel	August 6, 2021	Retired
CB	Mark Fields	August 10, 2021	Waived
G	Isaiah Williams	August 10, 2021	Waived
WR	Kevin White	August 11, 2021	Released
LB	Davin Bellamy	August 12, 2021	Waived
LB	James Burgess	August 16, 2021	Waived
LB	Donald Payne	August 16, 2021	Waived
DT	Eddie Vanderdoes	August 16, 2021	Waived
TE	Joshua Perkins	August 17, 2021	Released
CB	Ken Webster	August 17, 2021	Waived
QB	Josh Rosen	August 17, 2021	Waived
LB	Shilique Calhoun	August 24, 2021	Released
CB	B. W. Webb	August 24, 2021	Released
WR	River Cracraft	August 24, 2021	Waived
OT	Corbin Kaufusi	August 24, 2021	Waived
FS	Kai Nacua	August 27, 2021	Released
WR	River Cracraft	August 28, 2021	Waived
WR	Travis Benjamin	August 31, 2021	Released
C	Jake Brendel	August 31, 2021	Released
S	Ha Ha Clinton-Dix	August 31, 2021	Released
RB	Wayne Gallman	August 31, 2021	Released
CB	Dontae Johnson	August 31, 2021	Released
OG	Senio Kelemete	August 31, 2021	Released
TE	Jordan Matthews	August 31, 2021	Released
TE	MyCole Pruitt	August 31, 2021	Released
QB	Nate Sudfeld	August 31, 2021	Released
DE	Eddie Yarbrough	August 31, 2021	Released
DE	Alex Barrett	August 31, 2021	Waived
WR	River Cracraft	August 31, 2021	Waived
DT	Darrion Daniels	August 31, 2021	Waived
FB	Josh Hokit	August 31, 2021	Waived
OT	Corbin Kaufusi	August 31, 2021	Waived
S	Jared Mayden	August 31, 2021	Waived
OT	Colton McKivitz	August 31, 2021	Waived
CB	Alexander Myres	August 31, 2021	Waived
OG	Dakoda Shepley	August 31, 2021	Waived
WR	Nsimba Webster	August 31, 2021	Waived
CB	Dontae Johnson	September 6, 2021	Released

== Draft ==
2021 San Francisco 49ers Draft
Round	Selection	Player	Position	College	Notes
1	3	Trey Lance	QB	North Dakota State	From Houston via Miami
2	48	Aaron Banks	OG	Notre Dame	From Las Vegas
3	88	Trey Sermon	RB	Ohio State	From Los Angeles Rams
3	102	Ambry Thomas	CB	Michigan	2020 Resolution JC-2A picks
5	155	Jaylon Moore	OG	Western Michigan	
5	172	Deommodore Lenoir	CB	Oregon	From New Orleans
5	180	Talanoa Hufanga	S	USC	Compensatory pick
6	194	Elijah Mitchell	RB	Louisiana	

Notes

- San Francisco traded its first-round selection (12th overall), a 2022 first-round selection, a 2022 third-round selection and a 2023 first-round selection to Miami in exchange for a first-round selection (3rd overall).
- San Francisco traded its second-round (43rd overall) and seventh-round (230th overall) selections to Vegas in exchange for a second-round (48th overall) and fourth (121st overall) selections.
- San Francisco traded 2 fourth-round selections (117th and 121st overall) to Los Angeles in exchange for a third-round selection (88th overall).
- San Francisco traded Kwon Alexander to New Orleans in exchange for a fifth-round conditional pick and LB Kiko Alonso.
- San Francisco traded its third-round and 2020 fifth-round selections to Washington in exchange for offensive tackle Trent Williams.
- San Francisco received third-round selections in 2021, 2022, and 2023, as compensation when defensive coordinator Robert Saleh was hired by the New York Jets as head coach and vice president of player personnel Martin Mayhew was hired by the Washington Football Team as general manager.
- San Francisco lost its 2021 seventh round selection, as Marquise Goodwin reverted from Philadelphia back to San Francisco.
- San Francisco acquired a seventh round selection (No. 230) and defensive end Jordan Willis from the New York Jets in exchange for a 2022 sixth round selection.

=== Undrafted free agents ===
2021 San Francisco 49ers Undrafted Free Agents
Position	Player	College	Notes
OL	Alfredo Gutiérrez	Tecnológico de Monterrey	Waived on August 31
LB	Justin Hilliard	Ohio State	Waived on August 31
TE	Josh Pederson	Louisiana-Monroe	Waived on August 4
LB	Elijah Sullivan	Kansas State	Waived on August 31
WR	Austin Watkins	Alabama at Birmingham	Waived on August 17

== Staff ==
2021 San Francisco 49ers staff
Front office: Co-chairman – Denise DeBartolo York; Co-chairman – John York; Chief executive officer – Jed York; President – Al Guido; Chief administrative officer and general counsel - Hanna Gordon; General manager – John Lynch; Assistant general manager – Adam Peters; Executive vice president of football operations – Paraag Marathe; Vice president and senior advisor – Keena Turner; Director of player personnel – Ran Carthon; Director of college scouting – Ethan Waugh; Assistant director of college scouting – Tariq Ahmad; National scout – Justin Chabot; Vice president of football administration – Brian Hampton; Head coaches: Head coach – Kyle Shanahan; Assistant head coach/tight ends – Jon Embree; Offensive coaches: Offensive coordinator – Mike McDaniel; Quarterbacks – Rich Scangarello; Running backs – Bobby Turner; Wide receivers – Wes Welker; Offensive line – Chris Foerster; Assistant offensive line – Butch Barry; Assistant offensive line – Zach Yenser; Offensive passing game specialist – Bobby Slowik; Offensive quality control – Brian Fleury; Offensive quality control – Leonard Hankerson	Defensive coaches: Defensive coordinator – DeMeco Ryans; Defensive line – Kris Kocurek; Assistant defensive line – Darryl Tapp; Linebackers – Johnny Holland; Defensive pass game specialist/secondary – Cory Undlin; Safeties – Daniel Bullocks; Senior defensive assistant/run game specialist – James Bettcher; Defensive quality control – Andrew Hayes-Stoker; Defensive quality control – Klay Kubiak; Special teams coaches: Special teams coordinator – Richard Hightower; Assistant special teams – Matthew Harper; Special teams quality control – August Mangin; Strength and conditioning: Head strength and conditioning – Dustin Perry; Assistant strength and conditioning – Aaron Hill and Greg Segrove; Director, performance monitoring/assistant strength and conditioning – Shea Thompson

== Final roster ==
2021 San Francisco 49ers roster
Quarterbacks (QB): 10 Jimmy Garoppolo; 5 Trey Lance; Running backs (RB): 49 Trenton Cannon; 23 JaMycal Hasty; 44 Kyle Juszczyk FB; 25 Elijah Mitchell; 28 Trey Sermon; 22 Jeff Wilson; Wide receivers (WR): 11 Brandon Aiyuk; 17 Travis Benjamin; 15 Jauan Jennings; 19 Deebo Samuel; 6 Mohamed Sanu; 81 Trent Sherfield; Tight ends (TE): 82 Ross Dwelley; 85 George Kittle; 89 Charlie Woerner	Offensive linemen (OL): 65 Aaron Banks G; 64 Jake Brendel C; 60 Daniel Brunskill G; 66 Tom Compton G; 50 Alex Mack C; 68 Colton McKivitz T; 76 Jaylon Moore T; 75 Laken Tomlinson G; 71 Trent Williams T; Defensive linemen (DL): 91 Arik Armstead DE; 97 Nick Bosa DE; 56 Samson Ebukam DE; 90 Kevin Givens DT; 96 Maurice Hurst Jr. DT; 93 D. J. Jones DT; 98 Arden Key DE; 92 Charles Omenihu DE; 95 Kentavius Street DT; 94 Jordan Willis DE	Linebackers (LB): 51 Azeez Al-Shaair OLB; 45 Demetrius Flannigan-Fowles OLB; 57 Dre Greenlaw OLB; 36 Marcell Harris MLB; 54 Fred Warner MLB; Defensive backs (DB): 29 Talanoa Hufanga SS; 27 Dontae Johnson CB; 38 Deommodore Lenoir CB; 4 Emmanuel Moseley CB; 26 Josh Norman CB; 3 Jaquiski Tartt SS; 20 Ambry Thomas CB; 1 Jimmie Ward FS; 24 K'Waun Williams CB; Special teams (ST): 9 Robbie Gould K; 46 Taybor Pepper LS; 18 Mitch Wishnowsky P	Practice squad: 58 Alex Barrett DE; 67 Darrion Daniels DT (PS/I); 43 Darqueze Dennard CB; 77 Alfredo Gutiérrez C (IPP); 61 Jon Halapio C; 35 Brian Hill RB; 47 Lavert Hill CB; 40 Josh Hokit FB; 84 Tanner Hudson TE; 86 Austin Mack WR; 88 Jordan Matthews TE; 62 Wyatt Miller T; 53 Mark Nzeocha MLB; 59 Curtis Robinson OLB; 78 Chris Slayton DT; 7 Nate Sudfeld QB; 83 Connor Wedington WR; 30 Jarrod Wilson FS; Reserve: 55 Dee Ford DE (IR); 13 Richie James WR (IR); -- KeeSean Johnson WR (Futures); 99 Javon Kinlaw DT (IR); 69 Mike McGlinchey T (IR); 33 Tarvarius Moore SS (PUP); -- Justin Skule G (IR); 31 Raheem Mostert RB (IR); 2 Jason Verrett CB (IR); 32 Tavon Wilson SS (IR); Rookies in italics 53 active, 10 reserve, 16 practice squad (2 exempt)

== Preseason ==
The 49ers' preseason schedule was announced on May 12.

Week	Date	Opponent	Result	Record	Venue	Recap
1	August 14	Kansas City Chiefs	L 16–19	0–1	Levi's Stadium	Recap
2	August 22	at Los Angeles Chargers	W 15–10	1–1	SoFi Stadium	Recap
3	August 29	Las Vegas Raiders	W 34–10	2–1	Levi's Stadium	Recap

== Regular season ==
=== Schedule ===
The 49ers' 2021 schedule was announced on May 12.

Week	Date	Opponent	Result	Record	Venue	Recap
1	September 12	at Detroit Lions	**W** 41–33	1–0	Ford Field	Recap
2	September 19	at Philadelphia Eagles	**W** 17–11	2–0	Lincoln Financial Field	Recap
3	September 26	Green Bay Packers	**L** 28–30	2–1	Levi's Stadium	Recap
4	October 3	**Seattle Seahawks**	**L** 21–28	2–2	Levi's Stadium	Recap
5	October 10	at **Arizona Cardinals**	**L** 10–17	2–3	State Farm Stadium	Recap
6	Bye					
7	October 24	Indianapolis Colts	**L** 18–30	2–4	Levi's Stadium	Recap
8	October 31	at Chicago Bears	**W** 33–22	3–4	Soldier Field	Recap
9	November 7	**Arizona Cardinals**	**L** 17–31	3–5	Levi's Stadium	Recap
10	November 15	**Los Angeles Rams**	**W** 31–10	4–5	Levi's Stadium	Recap
11	November 21	at Jacksonville Jaguars	**W** 30–10	5–5	TIAA Bank Field	Recap
12	November 28	Minnesota Vikings	**W** 34–26	6–5	Levi's Stadium	Recap
13	December 5	at **Seattle Seahawks**	**L** 23–30	6–6	Lumen Field	Recap
14	December 12	at Cincinnati Bengals	**W** 26–23 (OT)	7–6	Paul Brown Stadium	Recap
15	December 19	Atlanta Falcons	**W** 31–13	8–6	Levi's Stadium	Recap
16	December 23	at Tennessee Titans	**L** 17–20	8–7	Nissan Stadium	Recap
17	January 2, 2022	Houston Texans	**W** 23–7	9–7	Levi's Stadium	Recap
18	January 9, 2022	at **Los Angeles Rams**	**W** 27–24 (OT)	10–7	SoFi Stadium	Recap
Note: Intra-division opponents are in **bold** text.

=== Game summaries ===
==== Week 1: at Detroit Lions ====
Week One: San Francisco 49ers at Detroit Lions – Game summary

Quarter	1	2	3	4	Total
**49ers**	7	24	7	3	**41**
Lions	0	10	7	16	**33**

at Ford Field, Detroit, Michigan

- Date: September 12
- Game time: 1:00 p.m. EDT/10:00 a.m. PDT
- Game weather: None (indoor stadium)
- Game attendance: 59,374
- Referee: Brad Rogers
- TV announcers (Fox): Kevin Kugler, Mark Sanchez and Laura Okmin
- Recap, Game Book

Game information

**First quarter**

- SF – Trent Sherfield 5-yard pass from Trey Lance (Robbie Gould kick), 5:41. 49ers 7–0. **Drive: 7 plays, 59 yards, 3:55.**

**Second quarter**

- DET – T. J. Hockenson 6-yard pass from Jared Goff (Austin Seibert kick), 13:29. Tied 7–7. **Drive: 13 plays, 82 yards, 7:12.**
- SF – Elijah Mitchell 38-yard run (Robbie Gould kick), 11:12. 49ers 14–7. **Drive: 4 plays, 78 yards, 2:17.**
- DET – Austin Seibert 49-yard field goal, 6:13. 49ers 14–10. **Drive: 9 plays, 44 yards, 4:59.**
- SF – JaMycal Hasty 3-yard run (Robbie Gould kick), 2:25. 49ers 21–10. **Drive: 7 plays, 75 yards, 3:48.**
- SF – Dre Greenlaw 39-yard interception return (Robbie Gould kick), 1:10. 49ers 28–10.
- SF – Robbie Gould 40-yard field goal, 0:03. 49ers 31–10. **Drive: 7 plays, 50 yards, 0:41.**

**Third quarter**

- SF – Deebo Samuel 79-yard pass from Jimmy Garoppolo (Robbie Gould kick), 7:54. 49ers 38–10. **Drive: 5 plays, 91 yards, 2:22.**
- DET – D'Andre Swift 43-yard pass from Jared Goff (Austin Seibert kick), 4:23. 49ers 38–17. **Drive: 7 plays, 75 yards, 3:31.**

**Fourth quarter**

- SF – Robbie Gould 52-yard field goal, 9:53. 49ers 41–17. **Drive: 7 plays, 19 yards, 3:45.**
- DET – Jamaal Williams 1-yard run (Jared Goff–T. J. Hockenson pass), 1:53. 49ers 41–25. **Drive: 12 plays, 86 yards, 3:52.**
- DET – Quintez Cephus 2-yard pass from Jared Goff (Jared Goff–Quintez Cephus pass), 1:07. 49ers 41–33. **Drive: 6 plays, 59 yards, 0:46.**

**Top passers**

- SF – Jimmy Garoppolo – 17/25, 314 yards, TD
- DET – Jared Goff – 38/57, 338 yards, 3 TD, INT

**Top rushers**

- SF – Elijah Mitchell – 19 rushes, 104 yards, TD
- DET – Jamaal Williams – 9 rushes, 54 yards, TD

**Top receivers**

- SF – Deebo Samuel – 9 receptions, 189 yards, TD
- DET – T. J. Hockenson – 8 receptions, 97 yards, TD

49ers hold on to go up 1-0 to kick off the 75th season.

==== Week 2: at Philadelphia Eagles ====
Week Two: San Francisco 49ers at Philadelphia Eagles – Game summary

Quarter	1	2	3	4	Total
**49ers**	0	7	0	10	**17**
Eagles	3	0	0	8	**11**

at Lincoln Financial Field, Philadelphia, Pennsylvania

- Date: September 19
- Game time: 1:00 p.m. EDT/10:00 a.m. PDT
- Game weather: Clear, 75 °F (24 °C)
- Game attendance: 69,796
- Referee: Brad Allen
- TV announcers (Fox): Adam Amin, Mark Schlereth and Shannon Spake
- Recap, Game Book

Game information

**First quarter**

- PHI – Jake Elliott 45-yard field goal, 4:45. Eagles 3–0. **Drive: 11 plays, 53 yards, 4:43.**

**Second quarter**

- SF – Jauan Jennings 11-yard pass from Jimmy Garoppolo (Robbie Gould kick), 0:12. 49ers 7–3. **Drive: 12 plays, 97 yards, 4:08.**

**Third quarter**

- No scoring plays.

**Fourth quarter**

- SF – Jimmy Garoppolo 1-yard run (Robbie Gould kick), 10:52. 49ers 14–3. **Drive: 16 plays, 92 yards, 8:59.**
- SF – Robbie Gould 46-yard field goal, 5:07. 49ers 17–3. **Drive: 9 plays, 53 yards, 3:10.**
- PHI – Jalen Hurts 1-yard run (Kenneth Gainwell run), 4:02. 49ers 17–11. **Drive: 5 plays, 75 yards, 1:05.**

**Top passers**

- SF – Jimmy Garoppolo – 22/30, 189 yards, TD
- PHI – Jalen Hurts – 12/23, 190 yards

**Top rushers**

- SF – Elijah Mitchell – 17 rushes, 42 yards
- PHI – Jalen Hurts – 10 rushes, 82 yards, TD

**Top receivers**

- SF – Deebo Samuel – 6 receptions, 93 yards
- PHI – Quez Watkins – 2 receptions, 117 yards

With the Victory, The 49ers are 2-0 on the season

==== Week 3: vs. Green Bay Packers ====
Week Three: Green Bay Packers at San Francisco 49ers – Game summary

Quarter	1	2	3	4	Total
**Packers**	10	7	0	13	**30**
49ers	0	7	7	14	**28**

at Levi's Stadium, Santa Clara, California

- Date: September 26
- Game time: 5:20 p.m. PDT
- Game weather: Scattered clouds, 69 °F (21 °C)
- Game attendance: 69,853
- Referee: Jerome Boger
- TV announcers (NBC): Al Michaels, Cris Collinsworth, Michele Tafoya and Terry McAulay
- Recap, Game Book

Game information

**First quarter**

- GB – Mason Crosby 54-yard field goal, 10:06. Packers 3–0. **Drive: 8 plays, 39 yards, 4:54.**
- GB – Davante Adams 1-yard pass from Aaron Rodgers (Mason Crosby kick), 3:19. Packers 10–0. **Drive: 7 plays, 80 yards, 4:06.**

**Second quarter**

- GB – Aaron Jones 3-yard run (Mason Crosby kick), 1:02. Packers 17–0. **Drive: 9 plays, 87 yards, 3:46.**
- SF – Trey Lance 1-yard run (Robbie Gould kick), 0:00. Packers 17–7. **Drive: 8 plays, 32 yards, 1:02.**

**Third quarter**

- SF – Brandon Aiyuk 8-yard pass from Jimmy Garoppolo (Robbie Gould kick), 7:41. Packers 17–14. **Drive: 13 plays, 83 yards, 7:19.**

**Fourth quarter**

- GB – Marquez Valdes-Scantling 12-yard pass from Aaron Rodgers (Mason Crosby kick), 13:27. Packers 24–14. **Drive: 10 plays, 86 yards, 5:57.**
- SF – Trey Sermon 1-yard run (Robbie Gould kick), 7:48. Packers 24–21. **Drive: 9 plays, 81 yards, 5:39.**
- GB – Mason Crosby 38-yard field goal, 2:39. Packers 27–21. **Drive: 5 plays, 18 yards, 2:19.**
- SF – Kyle Juszczyk 12-yard pass from Jimmy Garoppolo (Robbie Gould kick), 0:37. 49ers 28–27. **Drive: 8 plays, 75 yards, 2:02.**
- GB – Mason Crosby 51-yard field goal, 0:00. Packers 30–28. **Drive: 6 plays, 42 yards, 0:37.**

**Top passers**

- GB – Aaron Rodgers – 23/33, 261 yards, 2 TD
- SF – Jimmy Garoppolo – 25/40, 257 yards, 2 TD, INT

**Top rushers**

- GB – Aaron Jones – 19 rushes, 82 yards, TD
- SF – Trey Sermon – 10 rushes, 31 yards, TD

**Top receivers**

- GB – Davante Adams – 12 receptions, 132 yards, TD
- SF – George Kittle – 7 receptions, 92 yards

The Packers narrowly escape the 49ers and deliver San Francisco its first loss on the season.

==== Week 4: vs. Seattle Seahawks ====
Week Four: Seattle Seahawks at San Francisco 49ers – Game summary

Quarter	1	2	3	4	Total
**Seahawks**	0	7	14	7	**28**
49ers	7	0	6	8	**21**

at Levi's Stadium, Santa Clara, California

- Date: October 3
- Game time: 1:05 p.m. PDT
- Game weather: Hazy skies, 88 °F (31 °C)
- Game attendance: 68,912
- Referee: Carl Cheffers
- TV announcers (Fox): Adam Amin, Mark Schlereth and Shannon Spake
- Recap, Game Book

Game information

**First quarter**

- SF – Ross Dwelley 21-yard pass from Jimmy Garoppolo (Mitch Wishnowsky kick), 9:35. 49ers 7–0. **Drive: 8 plays, 71 yards, 4:13.**

**Second quarter**

- SEA – DK Metcalf 12-yard pass from Russell Wilson (Jason Myers kick), 1:54. Tied 7–7. **Drive: 6 plays, 80 yards, 2:55.**

**Third quarter**

- SEA – Russell Wilson 16-yard run (Jason Myers kick), 5:22. Seahawks 14–7. **Drive: 7 plays, 66 yards, 3:31.**
- SEA – Freddie Swain 13-yard pass from Russell Wilson (Jason Myers kick), 4:26. Seahawks 21–7. **Drive: 2 plays, 14 yards, 0:50.**
- SF – Deebo Samuel 76-yard pass from Trey Lance (kick failed), 2:10. Seahawks 21–13. **Drive: 4 plays, 89 yards, 2:16.**

**Fourth quarter**

- SEA – Alex Collins 14-yard run (Jason Myers kick), 12:07. Seahawks 28–13. **Drive: 10 plays, 81 yards, 5:03.**
- SF – Deebo Samuel 8-yard pass from Trey Lance (Trey Lance run), 1:20. Seahawks 28–21. **Drive: 13 plays, 80 yards, 3:10.**

**Top passers**

- SEA – Russell Wilson – 16/23, 149 yards, 2 TD
- SF – Jimmy Garoppolo – 14/23, 165 yards, TD, INT

**Top rushers**

- SEA – Alex Collins – 10 rushes, 44 yards, TD
- SF – Trey Sermon – 19 rushes, 89 yards

**Top receivers**

- SEA – DK Metcalf – 4 receptions, 65 yards, TD
- SF – Deebo Samuel – 8 receptions, 156 yards, 2 TD

Despite a late rally, the 49ers could not hold off the Seahawks at Levi's and drop to 2–2 on the season.

==== Week 5: at Arizona Cardinals ====
Week Five: San Francisco 49ers at Arizona Cardinals – Game summary

Quarter	1	2	3	4	Total
49ers	0	0	7	3	**10**
**Cardinals**	7	3	0	7	**17**

at State Farm Stadium, Glendale, Arizona

- Date: October 10
- Game time: 1:25 p.m. MST & PDT
- Game weather: None (retractable roof closed)
- Game attendance: 62,716
- Referee: Clay Martin
- TV announcers (Fox): Kevin Kugler, Mark Sanchez and Laura Okmin
- Recap, Game Book

Game information

**First quarter**

- ARI – James Conner 1-yard run (Matt Prater kick), 9:02. Cardinals 7–0. **Drive: 8 plays, 66 yards, 3:44.**

**Second quarter**

- ARI – Matt Prater 21-yard field goal, 5:27. Cardinals 10–0. **Drive: 14 plays, 96 yards, 5:59.**

**Third quarter**

- SF – Deebo Samuel 13-yard run, (Joey Slye kick) 1:42. Cardinals 10–7. **Drive: 6 plays, 59 yards, 3:28.**

**Fourth quarter**

- ARI – DeAndre Hopkins 9-yard pass from Kyler Murray, (Matt Prater kick) 5:13. Cardinals 17–7. **Drive: 5 plays, 52 yards, 2:36.**
- SF – Joey Slye 47-yard field goal, 4:12. Cardinals 17–10. **Drive: 6 plays, 46 yards, 1:01.**

**Top passers**

- SF – Trey Lance – 15/29, 192 yards, INT
- ARI – Kyler Murray – 22/31, 239 yards, TD

**Top rushers**

- SF – Trey Lance – 16 rushes, 89 yards
- ARI – Rondale Moore – 3 rushes, 38 yards

**Top receivers**

- SF – Deebo Samuel – 3 receptions, 58 yards
- ARI – DeAndre Hopkins – 6 receptions, 87 yards, TD

In Trey Lance's first NFL start the 49ers lose a closer than expected game and fall to 2–3 on the season.

==== Week 7: vs. Indianapolis Colts ====
Week Seven: Indianapolis Colts at San Francisco 49ers – Game summary

Quarter	1	2	3	4	Total
**Colts**	7	6	7	10	**30**
49ers	12	0	0	6	**18**

at Levi's Stadium, Santa Clara, California

- Date: October 24
- Game time: 5:20 p.m. PDT
- Game weather: Cloudy, rainy, 64 °F (18 °C)
- Game attendance: 56,576
- Referee: Craig Wrolstad
- TV announcers (NBC): Al Michaels, Cris Collinsworth, Michele Tafoya and Terry McAulay
- Recap, Game Book

Game information

**First quarter**

- SF – Elijah Mitchell 14-yard run (kick failed, wide right), 10:12. 49ers 6–0. **Drive: 8 plays, 78 yards, 4:48.**
- SF – Joey Slye 34-yard field goal, 8:08. 49ers 9–0. **Drive: 5 plays, 12 yards, 1:44.**
- IND – Mo Alie-Cox 11-yard pass from Carson Wentz (Michael Badgley kick), 5:15. 49ers 9–7. **Drive: 6 plays, 75 yards, 2:53.**
- SF – Joey Slye 56-yard field goal, 2:27. 49ers 12–7. **Drive: 6 plays, 39 yards, 2:48.**

**Second quarter**

- IND – Carson Wentz 1-yard run (pass failed) 1:00. Colts 13–12. **Drive: 5 plays, 28 yards, 2:02.**

**Third quarter**

- IND – Jonathan Taylor 5-yard run (Michael Badgley kick), 3:45. Colts 20–12. **Drive: 1 play, 33 yards, 0:53.**

**Fourth quarter**

- SF – Deebo Samuel 14-yard pass from Jimmy Garoppolo (pass failed), 13:07. Colts 20–18. **Drive: 3 plays, 70 yards, 1:11.**
- IND – Michael Badgley 42-yard field goal, 7:00. Colts 23–18. **Drive: 10 plays, 49 yards, 6:07.**
- IND – Michael Pittman Jr. 28-yard pass from Carson Wentz (Michael Badgley kick), 2:49. Colts 30–18. **Drive: 6 plays, 39 yards, 2:31.**

**Top passers**

- IND – Carson Wentz – 17/26, 150 yards, 2 TD
- SF – Jimmy Garoppolo – 16/27, 181 yards, TD, 2 INT

**Top rushers**

- IND – Jonathan Taylor – 18 rushes, 107 yards, TD
- SF – Elijah Mitchell – 18 rushes, 107 yards, TD

**Top receivers**

- IND – Michael Pittman Jr. – 4 receptions, 105 yards, TD
- SF – Deebo Samuel – 7 receptions, 100 yards, TD

With their fourth loss in a row, the 49ers go down to 2–4.

==== Week 8: at Chicago Bears ====
Week Eight: San Francisco 49ers at Chicago Bears – Game summary

Quarter	1	2	3	4	Total
**49ers**	3	6	6	18	**33**
Bears	3	10	3	6	**22**

at Soldier Field, Chicago, Illinois

- Date: October 31
- Game time: 12:00 p.m. CDT/10:00 a.m. PDT
- Game weather: Partly sunny, 52 °F (11 °C)
- Game attendance: 60,877
- Referee: Land Clark
- TV announcers (Fox): Adam Amin, Greg Olsen and Pam Oliver
- Recap, Game Book

Game information

**First quarter**

- CHI – Cairo Santos 39-yard field goal, 4:38. Bears 3–0. **Drive: 9 plays, 41 yards, 5:10.**
- SF – Joey Slye 48-yard field goal, 2:51. Tied 3–3. **Drive: 6 plays, 45 yards, 1:47.**

**Second quarter**

- CHI – Jesse James 8-yard pass from Justin Fields (Cairo Santos kick), 12:03. Bears 10–3. **Drive: 11 plays, 74 yards, 5:48.**
- SF – Joey Slye 52-yard field goal, 9:33. Bears 10–6. **Drive: 7 plays, 41 yards, 2:30.**
- CHI – Cairo Santos 40-yard field goal, 1:16. Bears 13–6. **Drive: 16 plays, 57 yards, 8:17.**
- SF – Joey Slye 22-yard field goal, 0:00. Bears 13–9. **Drive: 7 plays, 71 yards, 1:16.**

**Third quarter**

- CHI – Cairo Santos 25-yard field goal, 8:33. Bears 16–9. **Drive: 13 plays, 62 yards, 6:27.**
- SF – Jimmy Garoppolo 2-yard run (kick failed, wide right), 5:56. Bears 16–15. **Drive: 7 plays, 75 yards, 2:37.**

**Fourth quarter**

- SF – Elijah Mitchell 5-yard run (Jimmy Garoppolo–Brandon Aiyuk pass), 14:11. 49ers 23–16. **Drive: 6 plays, 52 yards, 2:49.**
- CHI – Justin Fields 22-yard run (kick failed, wide right), 9:32. 49ers 23–22. **Drive: 9 plays, 68 yards, 4:39.**
- SF – Jimmy Garoppolo 5-yard run (Joey Slye kick), 6:34. 49ers 30–22. **Drive: 5 plays, 75 yards, 2:58.**
- SF – Joey Slye 32-yard field goal, 1:56. 49ers 33–22. **Drive: 7 plays, 49 yards, 2:28.**

**Top passers**

- SF – Jimmy Garoppolo – 17/28, 322 yards
- CHI – Justin Fields – 19/27, 175 yards, TD, INT

**Top rushers**

- SF – Elijah Mitchell – 18 rushes, 137 yards, TD
- CHI – Justin Fields – 10 rushes, 103 yards, TD

**Top receivers**

- SF – Deebo Samuel – 6 receptions, 171 yards
- CHI – Darnell Mooney – 6 receptions, 64 yards

Despite struggling in the first half of the game falling behind 16–9, the 49ers would rally, outscoring the Bears 24–6 to pick up the win and improving them to 3–4.

==== Week 9: vs. Arizona Cardinals ====
Week Nine: Arizona Cardinals at San Francisco 49ers – Game summary

Quarter	1	2	3	4	Total
**Cardinals**	14	3	14	0	**31**
49ers	0	7	7	3	**17**

at Levi's Stadium, Santa Clara, California

- Date: November 7
- Game time: 1:25 p.m. PST
- Game weather: Scattered clouds, 62 °F (17 °C)
- Game attendance: 59,012
- Referee: Brad Allen
- TV announcers (Fox): Kevin Kugler, Mark Sanchez and Laura Okmin
- Recap, Game Book

Game information

**First quarter**

- ARI – James Conner 13-yard run (Matt Prater kick), 6:08. Cardinals 7–0. **Drive: 9 plays, 57 yards, 4:21.**
- ARI – James Conner 1-yard run (Matt Prater kick), 0:39. Cardinals 14–0. **Drive: 8 plays, 80 yards, 3:59.**

**Second quarter**

- ARI – Matt Prater 26-yard field goal, 4:02. Cardinals 17–0. **Drive: 14 plays, 85 yards, 8:23.**
- SF – George Kittle 6-yard pass from Jimmy Garoppolo (Robbie Gould kick), 0:16. Cardinals 17–7. **Drive: 9 plays, 75 yards, 3:46.**

**Third quarter**

- ARI – James Conner 45-yard pass from Colt McCoy (Matt Prater kick), 13:33. Cardinals 24–7. **Drive: 3 plays, 72 yards, 1:27.**
- ARI – Eno Benjamin 21-yard run (Matt Prater kick), 8:05. Cardinals 31–7. **Drive: 7 plays, 71 yards, 3:47.**
- SF – Brandon Aiyuk 11-yard pass from Jimmy Garoppolo (Robbie Gould kick), 4:56. Cardinals 31–14. **Drive: 6 plays, 75 yards, 3:09.**

**Fourth quarter**

- SF – Robbie Gould 26-yard field goal, 8:23. Cardinals 31–17. **Drive: 7 plays, 28 yards, 2:34.**

**Top passers**

- ARI – Colt McCoy – 22/26, 249 yards, TD
- SF – Jimmy Garoppolo – 28/40, 322 yards, 2 TD, INT

**Top rushers**

- ARI – James Conner – 21 rushes, 96 yards, 2 TD
- SF – Elijah Mitchell – 8 rushes, 36 yards

**Top receivers**

- ARI – Christian Kirk – 6 receptions, 91 yards
- SF – George Kittle – 6 receptions, 101 yards, TD

Despite the Cardinals having an injury–depleted roster, the 49ers suffer an embarrassing loss to former 49ers QB Colt McCoy and fall to 3–5 on the season.

==== Week 10: vs. Los Angeles Rams ====
Week Ten: Los Angeles Rams at San Francisco 49ers – Game summary

Quarter	1	2	3	4	Total
Rams	0	7	0	3	**10**
**49ers**	14	7	3	7	**31**

at Levi's Stadium, Santa Clara, California

- Date: November 15
- Game time: 5:15 p.m. PST
- Game weather: Overcast, 62 °F (17 °C)
- Game attendance: 64,256
- Referee: Shawn Smith
- TV announcers (ESPN): Steve Levy, Brian Griese, Louis Riddick, Lisa Salters and John Parry
- Recap, Game Book

Game information

**First quarter**

- SF – George Kittle 8-yard pass from Jimmy Garoppolo (Robbie Gould kick), 1:54. 49ers 7–0. **Drive: 18 plays, 93 yards, 11:03.**
- SF – Jimmie Ward 27-yard interception return (Robbie Gould kick), 0:49. 49ers 14–0.

**Second quarter**

- LAR – Tyler Higbee 10-yard pass from Matthew Stafford (Matt Gay kick), 13:16. 49ers 14–7. **Drive: 7 plays, 75 yards, 2:33.**
- SF – Deebo Samuel 8-yard run (Robbie Gould kick), 5:24. 49ers 21–7. **Drive: 11 plays, 91 yards, 7:52.**

**Third quarter**

- SF – Robbie Gould 50-yard field goal, 4:38. 49ers 24–7. **Drive: 10 plays, 31 yards, 6:14.**

**Fourth quarter**

- SF – Deebo Samuel 40-yard pass from Jimmy Garoppolo (Robbie Gould kick), 11:07. 49ers 31–7. **Drive: 6 plays, 56 yards, 3:53.**
- LAR – Matt Gay 37-yard field goal, 3:48. 49ers 31–10. **Drive: 7 plays, 33 yards, 1:11.**

**Top passers**

- LAR – Matthew Stafford – 26/41, 243 yards, TD, 2 INT
- SF – Jimmy Garoppolo – 15/19, 182 yards, 2 TD

**Top rushers**

- LAR – Darrell Henderson Jr. – 5 rushes, 31 yards
- SF – Elijah Mitchell – 27 rushes, 91 yards

**Top receivers**

- LAR – Cooper Kupp – 11 receptions, 122 yards
- SF – Deebo Samuel – 5 receptions, 97 yards, TD

The 49ers bounced back against their interstate rivals, defeating them for the 5th consecutive time and bringing their record up to 4–5 for the season.

==== Week 11: at Jacksonville Jaguars ====
Week Eleven: San Francisco 49ers at Jacksonville Jaguars – Game summary

Quarter	1	2	3	4	Total
**49ers**	3	17	7	3	**30**
Jaguars	0	3	0	7	**10**

at TIAA Bank Field, Jacksonville, Florida

- Date: November 21
- Game time: 1:00 p.m. EST/10:00 a.m. PST
- Game weather: Sunny, 67 °F (19 °C)
- Game attendance: 60,268
- Referee: Ronald Torbert
- TV announcers (Fox): Chris Myers, Daryl Johnston and Jen Hale
- Recap, Game Book

Game information

**First quarter**

- SF – Robbie Gould 20-yard field goal, 1:55. 49ers 3–0. **Drive: 20 plays, 87 yards, 13:05.**

**Second quarter**

- SF – Deebo Samuel 25-yard run (Robbie Gould kick), 11:24. 49ers 10–0. **Drive: 7 plays, 80 yards, 3:56.**
- SF – Brandon Aiyuk 6-yard pass from Jimmy Garoppolo (Robbie Gould kick), 8:25. 49ers 17–0. **Drive: 7 plays, 35 yards, 2:51.**
- JAX – Matthew Wright 30-yard field goal, 1:53. 49ers 17–3. **Drive: 12 plays, 67 yards, 6:32.**
- SF – Robbie Gould 48-yard field goal, 0:00. 49ers 20–3. **Drive: 7 plays, 45 yards, 1:53.**

**Third quarter**

- SF – George Kittle 1-yard pass from Jimmy Garoppolo (Robbie Gould kick), 8:49. 49ers 27–3. **Drive: 11 plays, 77 yards, 5:45.**

**Fourth quarter**

- SF – Robbie Gould 45-yard field goal, 5:33. 49ers 30–3. **Drive: 5 plays, 17 yards, 3:00.**
- JAX – James Robinson 1-yard run (Matthew Wright kick), 3:04. 49ers 30–10. **Drive: 8 plays, 75 yards, 2:29.**

**Top passers**

- SF – Jimmy Garoppolo – 16/22, 176 yards, 2 TD
- JAX – Trevor Lawrence – 16/25, 158 yards

**Top rushers**

- SF – Deebo Samuel – 8 rushes, 79 yards, TD
- JAX – James Robinson – 12 rushes, 29 yards, TD

**Top receivers**

- SF – Brandon Aiyuk – 7 receptions, 85 yards, TD
- JAX – Laviska Shenault – 5 receptions, 50 yards

49ers got back to .500 by beating the Jags.

==== Week 12: vs. Minnesota Vikings ====
Week Twelve: Minnesota Vikings at San Francisco 49ers – Game summary

Quarter	1	2	3	4	Total
Vikings	7	7	12	0	**26**
**49ers**	7	7	20	0	**34**

at Levi's Stadium, Santa Clara, California

- Date: November 28
- Game time: 1:25 p.m. PST
- Game weather: Clear, 67 °F (19 °C)
- Game attendance: 71,493
- Referee: Brad Rogers
- TV announcers (Fox): Kenny Albert, Jonathan Vilma, and Sara Walsh
- Recap, Game Book

Game information

**First quarter**

- MIN – Adam Thielen 2-yard pass from Kirk Cousins (Greg Joseph kick), 8:27. Vikings 7–0. **Drive: 8 plays, 49 yards, 3:33.**
- SF – Deebo Samuel 20-yard run (Robbie Gould kick), 5:31. Tied 7–7. **Drive: 6 plays, 75 yards, 2:56.**

**Second quarter**

- MIN – Adam Thielen 20-yard pass from Kirk Cousins (Greg Joseph kick), 12:42. Vikings 14–7. **Drive: 6 plays, 80 yards, 2:50.**
- SF – Jauan Jennings 3-yard pass from Jimmy Garoppolo (Robbie Gould kick), 0:18. Tied 14–14. **Drive: 15 plays, 85 yards, 8:20.**

**Third quarter**

- SF – Deebo Samuel 3-yard run (Robbie Gould kick), 11:31. 49ers 21–14. **Drive: 6 plays, 75 yards, 3:29.**
- SF – Elijah Mitchell 2-yard run (Robbie Gould kick), 11:09. 49ers 28–14. **Drive: 1 play, 2 yards, 0:04.**
- MIN – Alexander Mattison 6-yard run (kick failed, wide right), 8:28. 49ers 28–20. **Drive: 5 plays, 75 yards, 2:41.**
- SF – Robbie Gould 46-yard field goal, 4:58. 49ers 31–20. **Drive: 7 plays, 47 yards, 3:30.**
- MIN – Kene Nwangwu 99-yard kickoff return (pass failed), 4:46. 49ers 31–26. **Drive: 0 plays, 0 yards, 0:12.**
- SF – Robbie Gould 22-yard field goal, 0:09. 49ers 34–26. **Drive: 4 plays, 5 yards, 1:21.**

**Fourth quarter**

- No scoring plays.

**Top passers**

- MIN – Kirk Cousins – 20/32, 238 yards, 2 TD, INT
- SF – Jimmy Garoppolo – 17/26, 230 yards, TD, INT

**Top rushers**

- MIN – Dalvin Cook – 10 rushes, 39 yards
- SF – Elijah Mitchell – 27 rushes, 133 yards, TD

**Top receivers**

- MIN – Justin Jefferson – 4 receptions, 83 yards
- SF – Brandon Aiyuk – 3 receptions, 91 yards

In a crucial game for seeding, the 49ers pulled off a late victory to take the tie breaker and went up to 6–5 on the season.

==== Week 13: at Seattle Seahawks ====
Week Thirteen: San Francisco 49ers at Seattle Seahawks – Game summary

Quarter	1	2	3	4	Total
49ers	14	9	0	0	**23**
**Seahawks**	7	14	9	0	**30**

at Lumen Field, Seattle, Washington

- Date: December 5
- Game time: 1:25 p.m. PST
- Game weather: Sunny, 41 °F (5 °C)
- Game attendance: 68,758
- Referee: Alex Kemp
- TV announcers (CBS): Kevin Harlan, Tiki Barber and Melanie Collins
- Recap, Game Book

Game information

**First quarter**

- SEA – Travis Homer 73-yard run (Jason Myers kick), 13:11. Seahawks 7–0. **Drive: 4 plays, 77 yards, 1:49.**
- SF – George Kittle 24-yard pass from Jimmy Garoppolo (Robbie Gould kick), 10:27. Tied 7–7. **Drive: 1 play, 24 yards, 0:07.**
- SF – Elijah Mitchell 2-yard run (Robbie Gould kick), 1:32. 49ers 14–7. **Drive: 9 plays, 54 yards, 4:10.**

**Second quarter**

- SF – Robbie Gould 50-yard field goal, 9:43. 49ers 17–7. **Drive: 9 plays, 31 yards, 5:02.**
- SEA – Adrian Peterson 1-yard run (Jason Myers kick), 5:35. 49ers 17–14. **Drive: 9 plays, 63 yards, 4:08.**
- SF – George Kittle 48-yard pass from Jimmy Garoppolo (kick failed), 1:48. 49ers 23–14. **Drive: 7 plays, 75 yards, 3:47.**
- SEA – D'Wayne Eskridge 7-yard pass from Russell Wilson (Jason Myers kick), 0:12. 49ers 23–21. **Drive: 8 plays, 65 yards, 1:36.**

**Third quarter**

- SEA – Carlos Dunlap sacked Jimmy Garoppolo in end zone for a safety, 10:28. Tied 23–23.
- SEA – Tyler Lockett 12-yard pass from Russell Wilson (Jason Myers kick), 2:28. Seahawks 30–23. **Drive: 5 plays, 28 yards, 2:09.**

**Fourth quarter**

- No scoring plays.

**Top passers**

- SF – Jimmy Garoppolo – 20/30, 299 yards, 2 TD, 2 INT
- SEA – Russell Wilson – 30/37, 231 yards, 2 TD, INT

**Top rushers**

- SF – Elijah Mitchell – 22 rushes, 66 yards, TD
- SEA – Travis Homer – 3 rushes, 80 yards, TD

**Top receivers**

- SF – George Kittle – 9 receptions, 181 yards, 2 TD
- SEA – Tyler Lockett – 7 receptions, 68 yards, TD

The Seahawks snapped a 3 game win streak for the 49ers, as their record was evened out at 6–6. This marked the 49ers last loss in Seattle until 2025.

==== Week 14: at Cincinnati Bengals ====
Week Fourteen: San Francisco 49ers at Cincinnati Bengals – Game summary

Quarter	1	2	3	4	OT	Total
**49ers**	3	14	3	0	6	**26**
Bengals	3	3	0	14	3	**23**

at Paul Brown Stadium, Cincinnati, Ohio

- Date: December 12
- Game time: 4:25 p.m. EST/1:25 p.m. PST
- Game weather: Sunny, 45 °F (7 °C)
- Game attendance: 50,481
- Referee: Craig Wrolstad
- TV announcers (CBS): Greg Gumbel, Adam Archuleta and AJ Ross
- Recap, Game Book

Game information

**First quarter**

- SF – Robbie Gould 33-yard field goal, 6:37. 49ers 3–0. **Drive: 4 plays, 8 yards, 2:33.**
- CIN – Evan McPherson 37-yard field goal, 0:31. Tied 3–3. **Drive: 11 plays, 67 yards, 6:06.**

**Second quarter**

- SF – Deebo Samuel 27-yard run (Robbie Gould kick), 12:05. 49ers 10–3. **Drive: 6 plays, 75 yards, 3:26.**
- CIN – Evan McPherson 28-yard field goal, 1:42. 49ers 10–6. **Drive: 12 plays, 53 yards, 6:06.**
- SF – George Kittle 14-yard pass from Jimmy Garoppolo (Robbie Gould kick), 0:18. 49ers 17–6. **Drive: 4 plays, 31 yards, 0:39.**

**Third quarter**

- SF – Robbie Gould 24-yard field goal, 7:43. 49ers 20–6. **Drive: 12 plays, 69 yards, 5:17.**

**Fourth quarter**

- CIN – Ja'Marr Chase 17-yard pass from Joe Burrow (Evan McPherson kick), 9:20. 49ers 20–13. **Drive: 6 plays, 66 yards, 2:32.**
- CIN – Ja'Marr Chase 32-yard pass from Joe Burrow (Evan McPherson kick), 1:19. Tied 20–20. **Drive: 7 plays, 87 yards, 1:21.**

**Overtime**

- CIN – Evan McPherson 41-yard field goal, 6:15. Bengals 23–20. **Drive: 7 plays, 52 yards, 3:45.**
- SF – Brandon Aiyuk 12-yard pass from Jimmy Garoppolo, 1:53. 49ers 26–23. **Drive: 7 plays, 75 yards, 4:22.**

**Top passers**

- SF – Jimmy Garoppolo – 27/41, 296 yards, 2 TD
- CIN – Joe Burrow – 25/34, 348 yards, 2 TD

**Top rushers**

- SF – Jeff Wilson Jr. – 13 rushes, 56 yards
- CIN – Joe Mixon – 18 rushes, 58 yards

**Top receivers**

- SF – George Kittle – 13 receptions, 151 yards, TD
- CIN – Tee Higgins – 5 receptions, 114 yards

Late heroics and extra time was needed in this regular season classic, Aiyuk and the 49ers leaped to 7–6.

==== Week 15: vs. Atlanta Falcons ====
Week Fifteen: Atlanta Falcons at San Francisco 49ers – Game summary

Quarter	1	2	3	4	Total
Falcons	3	7	3	0	**13**
**49ers**	3	14	14	0	**31**

at Levi's Stadium, Santa Clara, California

- Date: December 19
- Game time: 1:05 p.m. PST
- Game weather: Clear, 52 °F (11 °C)
- Game attendance: 71,650
- Referee: Clay Martin
- TV announcers (CBS): Kevin Harlan, Trent Green and Melanie Collins
- Recap, Game Book

Game information

**First quarter**

- ATL – Younghoe Koo 48-yard field goal, 7:12. Falcons 3–0. **Drive: 7 plays, 19 yards, 3:49.**
- SF – Robbie Gould 30-yard field goal, 1:21. Tied 3–3. **Drive: 11 plays, 79 yards, 5:51.**

**Second quarter**

- SF – Kyle Juszczyk 6-yard run (Robbie Gould kick), 9:14. 49ers 10–3. **Drive: 8 plays, 77 yards, 4:16.**
- ATL – Russell Gage 20-yard pass from Matt Ryan (Younghoe Koo kick), 4:00. Tied 10–10. **Drive: 8 plays, 65 yards, 5:14.**
- SF – Deebo Samuel 10-yard run (Robbie Gould kick), 0:33. 49ers 17–10. **Drive: 6 plays, 75 yards, 3:27.**

**Third quarter**

- SF – Jeff Wilson Jr. 5-yard run (Robbie Gould kick), 11:11. 49ers 24–10. **Drive: 4 plays, 38 yards, 2:10.**
- ATL – Younghoe Koo 22-yard field goal, 6:28. 49ers 24–13. **Drive: 9 plays, 71 yards, 4:43.**
- SF – Jauan Jennings 4-yard pass from Jimmy Garoppolo (Robbie Gould kick), 1:17. 49ers 31–13. **Drive: 10 plays, 75 yards, 5:11.**

**Fourth quarter**

- No scoring plays.

**Top passers**

- ATL – Matt Ryan – 19/32, 236 yards, TD
- SF – Jimmy Garoppolo – 18/23, 235 yards, TD

**Top rushers**

- ATL – Mike Davis – 6 rushes, 21 yards
- SF – Jeff Wilson Jr. – 21 rushes, 110 yards, TD

**Top receivers**

- ATL – Russell Gage – 8 receptions, 91 yards, TD
- SF – George Kittle – 6 receptions, 93 yards

The 49ers inspired 3rd Quarter put them over the Falcons and onto 8–6.

==== Week 16: at Tennessee Titans ====
Week Sixteen: San Francisco 49ers at Tennessee Titans – Game summary

Quarter	1	2	3	4	Total
49ers	7	3	0	7	**17**
**Titans**	0	0	10	10	**20**

at Nissan Stadium, Nashville, Tennessee

- Date: December 23
- Game time: 7:20 p.m. CST/5:20 p.m. PST
- Game weather: Clear, 54 °F (12 °C)
- Game attendance: 69,361
- Referee: Shawn Hochuli
- TV announcers (NFLN): Kevin Burkhardt, Greg Olsen, Pam Oliver and Kristina Pink
- Recap, Game Book

Game information

**First quarter**

- SF – Jeff Wilson Jr. 1-yard run (Robbie Gould kick) 9:57. 49ers 7–0. **Drive: 9 plays, 75 yards, 5:03.**

**Second quarter**

- SF – Robbie Gould 48-yard field goal, 8:31. 49ers 10–0. **Drive: 11 plays, 33 yards, 6:19.**

**Third quarter**

- TEN – Randy Bullock 38-yard field goal, 8:45. 49ers 10–3. **Drive: 13 plays, 55 yards, 6:15.**
- TEN – D'Onta Foreman 3-yard run (Randy Bullock kick), 7:13. Tied 10–10. **Drive: 4 plays, 18 yards, 1:23.**

**Fourth quarter**

- TEN – A. J. Brown 18-yard pass from Ryan Tannehill (Randy Bullock kick), 13:02. Titans 17–10. **Drive: 7 plays, 59 yards, 3:51.**
- SF – Brandon Aiyuk 2-yard pass from Jimmy Garoppolo (Robbie Gould kick), 2:20. Tied 17–17. **Drive: 8 plays, 95 yards, 2:58.**
- TEN – Randy Bullock 44-yard field goal, 0:04. Titans 20–17. **Drive: 8 plays, 49 yards, 2:16.**

**Top passers**

- SF – Jimmy Garoppolo – 25/34, 322 yards, TD, 2 INT
- TEN – Ryan Tannehill – 22/29, 209 yards, TD

**Top rushers**

- SF – Jeff Wilson Jr. – 14 rushes, 45 yards, TD
- TEN – Jeremy McNichols – 7 rushes, 31 yards

**Top receivers**

- SF – Deebo Samuel – 9 receptions, 159 yards
- TEN – A. J. Brown – 11 receptions, 145 yards, TD

Despite taking a 10–0 lead, the 49ers could not overcome the Titans, who outscored them 20–7 to drop them to 8–7, making their playoff chances looking slim.

==== Week 17: vs. Houston Texans ====
Week Seventeen: Houston Texans at San Francisco 49ers – Game summary

Quarter	1	2	3	4	Total
Texans	0	7	0	0	**7**
**49ers**	0	3	7	13	**23**

at Levi's Stadium, Santa Clara, California

- Date: January 2
- Game time: 1:05 p.m. PST
- Game weather: Clear, 64 °F (18 °C)
- Game attendance: 71,612
- Referee: Carl Cheffers
- TV announcers (CBS): Greg Gumbel, Adam Archuleta and AJ Ross
- Recap, Game Book

Game information

**First quarter**

- No scoring plays.

**Second quarter**

- HOU – Brandin Cooks 8-yard pass from Davis Mills (Kaʻimi Fairbairn kick) 1:57. Texans 7–0. **Drive: 14 plays, 80 yards, 7:15.**
- SF – Robbie Gould 37-yard field goal, 0:00. Texans 7–3. **Drive: 6 plays, 56 yards, 0:38.**

**Third quarter**

- SF – Elijah Mitchell 8-yard pass from Trey Lance (Robbie Gould kick), 5:53. 49ers 10–7. **Drive: 4 plays, 58 yards, 2:21.**

**Fourth quarter**

- SF – Deebo Samuel 45-yard pass from Trey Lance (Robbie Gould kick), 9:56. 49ers 17–7. **Drive: 4 plays, 65 yards, 2:08.**
- SF – Robbie Gould 27-yard field goal, 3:19. 49ers 20–7. **Drive: 10 plays, 71 yards, 3:27.**
- SF – Robbie Gould 36-yard field goal, 1:12. 49ers 23–7. **Drive: 4 plays, 9 yards, 1:29.**

**Top passers**

- HOU – Davis Mills – 21/32, 163 yards, TD, INT
- SF – Trey Lance – 16/23, 249 yards, 2 TD, INT

**Top rushers**

- HOU – Rex Burkhead – 16 rushes, 47 yards
- SF – Elijah Mitchell – 21 rushes, 119 yards

**Top receivers**

- HOU – Brandin Cooks – 7 receptions, 66 yards, TD
- SF – Brandon Aiyuk – 4 receptions, 94 yards

In Levi's Season Finale the 49ers got off to a slow start, but then they cruised to their 9th victory in Trey Lance's 2nd NFL start to secure their 2nd winning season in 3 years.

==== Week 18: at Los Angeles Rams ====
Week Eighteen: San Francisco 49ers at Los Angeles Rams – Game summary

Quarter	1	2	3	4	OT	Total
**49ers**	0	3	14	7	3	**27**
Rams	3	14	0	7	0	**24**

at SoFi Stadium, Inglewood, California

- Date: January 9
- Game time: 1:25 p.m. PST
- Game weather: Sunny, 74 °F (23 °C)
- Game attendance: 74,447
- Referee: Jerome Boger
- TV announcers (Fox): Joe Buck, Troy Aikman, Erin Andrews and Tom Rinaldi
- Recap, Game Book

Game information

**First quarter**

- LAR – Matt Gay 43-yard field goal, 6:07. Rams 3–0. **Drive: 13 plays, 62 yards, 8:53.**

**Second quarter**

- LAR – Tyler Higbee 2-yard pass from Matthew Stafford (Matt Gay kick), 10:26. Rams 10–0. **Drive: 12 plays, 61 yards, 6:25.**
- LAR – Tyler Higbee 15-yard pass from Matthew Stafford (Matt Gay kick), 6:44. Rams 17–0. **Drive: 3 plays, 19 yards, 1:30.**
- SF – Robbie Gould 42-yard field goal, 0:00. Rams 17–3. **Drive: 6 plays, 61 yards, 0:38.**

**Third quarter**

- SF – Deebo Samuel 16-yard run (Robbie Gould kick), 10:32. Rams 17–10. **Drive: 7 plays, 75 yards, 4:28.**
- SF – Jauan Jennings 24-yard pass from Deebo Samuel (Robbie Gould kick), 1:46. Tied 17–17. **Drive: 11 plays, 74 yards, 7:02.**

**Fourth quarter**

- LAR – Cooper Kupp 4-yard pass from Matthew Stafford (Matt Gay kick), 2:29. Rams 24–17. **Drive: 9 plays, 92 yards, 5:13.**
- SF – Jauan Jennings 14-yard pass from Jimmy Garoppolo (Robbie Gould kick), 0:26. Tied 24–24. **Drive: 5 plays, 88 yards, 1:01.**

**Overtime**

- SF – Robbie Gould 24-yard field goal, 2:45. 49ers 27–24. **Drive: 12 plays, 69 yards, 7:15.**

**Top passers**

- SF – Jimmy Garoppolo – 23/32, 316 yards, TD, 2 INT
- LAR – Matthew Stafford – 21/32, 238 yards, 3 TD, 2 INT

**Top rushers**

- SF – Elijah Mitchell – 21 rushes, 85 yards
- LAR – Sony Michel – 21 rushes, 43 yards

**Top receivers**

- SF – Brandon Aiyuk – 6 receptions, 107 yards
- LAR – Cooper Kupp – 7 receptions, 118 yards, TD

In a game that looked like certain doom for the 49ers, the 49ers roared back to tie the game on a pass from Deebo Samuel to Jauan Jennings to tie the game up. In overtime, Robbie Gould put the 49ers ahead and Ambry Thomas officially punched the 49ers ticket to the playoffs when he picked off Matthew Stafford, the 49ers would finish the regular season at 10–7. This would be the Rams 7th consecutive defeat by the 49ers.

=== Standings ===
==== Division ====
NFC West
	W	L	T	PCT	DIV	CONF	PF	PA	STK
^{(4)} Los Angeles Rams	12	5	0	.706	3–3	8–4	460	372	L1
^{(5)} Arizona Cardinals	11	6	0	.647	4–2	7–5	449	366	L1
^{(6)} San Francisco 49ers	10	7	0	.588	2–4	7–5	427	365	W2
Seattle Seahawks	7	10	0	.412	3–3	4–8	395	366	W2

==== Conference ====
NFC
#	Team	Division	W	L	T	PCT	DIV	CONF	SOS	SOV	STK
**Division winners**
1 (Note: Green Bay finished ahead of Tampa Bay based on conference record (9–3 vs. 8–4), claiming the No. 1 seed.)	Green Bay Packers	North	13	4	0	.765	4–2	9–3	.479	.480	L1
2	Tampa Bay Buccaneers	South	13	4	0	.765	4–2	8–4	.467	.443	W3
3 (Note: Dallas claimed the No. 3 seed over LA Rams based on conference record (10–2 vs. 8–4).)	Dallas Cowboys	East	12	5	0	.706	6–0	10–2	.488	.431	W1
4	Los Angeles Rams	West	12	5	0	.706	3–3	8–4	.483	.409	L1
**Wild cards**
5	Arizona Cardinals	West	11	6	0	.647	4–2	7–5	.490	.492	L1
6	San Francisco 49ers	West	10	7	0	.588	2–4	7–5	.500	.438	W2
7 (Note: Philadelphia finished ahead of New Orleans based on head-to-head victory, claiming the 7th and final playoff spot.)	Philadelphia Eagles	East	9	8	0	.529	3–3	7–5	.469	.350	L1
**Did not qualify for the postseason**
8	New Orleans Saints	South	9	8	0	.529	4–2	7–5	.512	.516	W2
9	Minnesota Vikings	North	8	9	0	.471	4–2	6–6	.507	.434	W1
10 (Note: Washington finished ahead of Atlanta and Seattle based on head-to-head victories.)	Washington Football Team	East	7	10	0	.412	2–4	6–6	.529	.420	W1
11 (Note: Seattle finished ahead of Atlanta based on win percentage in common games (4–2 vs. 3–3 against: San Francisco, New Orleans, Jacksonville, Washington, and Detroit).)	Seattle Seahawks	West	7	10	0	.412	3–3	4–8	.519	.424	W2
12	Atlanta Falcons	South	7	10	0	.412	2–4	4–8	.472	.315	L2
13	Chicago Bears	North	6	11	0	.353	2–4	4–8	.524	.373	L1
14	Carolina Panthers	South	5	12	0	.294	2–4	3–9	.509	.412	L7
15	New York Giants	East	4	13	0	.235	1–5	3–9	.536	.485	L6
16	Detroit Lions	North	3	13	1	.206	2–4	3–9	.528	.627	W1
**Tiebreakers** (Note: When breaking ties for three or more teams under the NFL's rules, they are first broken within divisions, then comparing only the highest-ranked remaining team from each division.)

== Postseason ==
=== Schedule ===
Round	Date	Opponent (seed)	Result	Record	Venue	Recap
Wild Card	January 16	at Dallas Cowboys (3)	W 23–17	1–0	AT&T Stadium	Recap
Divisional	January 22	at Green Bay Packers (1)	W 13–10	2–0	Lambeau Field	Recap
NFC Championship	January 30	at Los Angeles Rams (4)	L 17–20	2–1	SoFi Stadium	Recap

=== Game summaries ===
==== NFC Wild Card Playoffs: at (3) Dallas Cowboys ====
NFC Wildcard Playoffs: (6) San Francisco 49ers at (3) Dallas Cowboys – Game summary

Quarter	1	2	3	4	Total
49ers	10	6	7	0	23
Cowboys	0	7	0	10	17

at AT&T Stadium, Arlington, Texas

- Date: January 16, 2022
- Game time: 3:30 p.m. CST/1:30 p.m. PST
- Game weather: None (retractable roof closed)
- Game attendance: 93,470
- Referee: Alex Kemp
- TV announcers (CBS/Nick):
  - CBS: Jim Nantz, Tony Romo, and Tracy Wolfson
  - Nickelodeon: Noah Eagle, Nate Burleson, Gabrielle Nevaeh Green, and Young Dylan
- Recap, Game Book

Game information

First quarter

- SF – Elijah Mitchell 4-yard run (Robbie Gould kick), 10:54. 49ers 7–0. Drive: 7 plays, 75 yards, 4:06.
- SF – Robbie Gould 53-yard field goal, 4:53. 49ers 10–0. Drive: 9 plays, 23 yards, 4:34.

Second quarter

- SF – Robbie Gould 40-yard field goal, 9:40. 49ers 13–0. Drive: 12 plays, 56 yards, 7:58.
- DAL – Amari Cooper 20-yard pass from Dak Prescott (Greg Zuerlein kick), 5:19. 49ers 13–7. Drive: 9 plays, 67 yards, 4:21.
- SF – Robbie Gould 52-yard field goal, 3:03. 49ers 16–7. Drive: 5 plays, 41 yards, 2:16.

Third quarter

- SF – Deebo Samuel 26-yard run (Robbie Gould kick), 5:50. 49ers 23–7. Drive: 1 play, 26 yards, 0:08.

Fourth quarter

- DAL – Greg Zuerlein 51-yard field goal, 11:53. 49ers 23–10. Drive: 11 plays, 37 yards, 4:41.
- DAL – Dak Prescott 5-yard run (Greg Zuerlein kick), 8:02. 49ers 23–17. Drive: 5 plays, 28 yards, 1:35.

Top passers

- SF – Jimmy Garoppolo – 16/25, 172 yards, INT
- DAL – Dak Prescott – 23/43, 254 yards, TD, INT

Top rushers

- SF – Elijah Mitchell – 27 rushes, 96 yards
- DAL – Ezekiel Elliott – 12 rushes, 31 yards

Top receivers

- SF – Brandon Aiyuk – 5 receptions, 66 yards
- DAL – Dalton Schultz – 7 receptions, 89 yards

In the first playoff meeting between these two teams since the 1994 NFC Championship, the 49ers upset the Cowboys 23–17. The 49ers' top-five defense shut down the NFL's highest scoring team (the Cowboys were averaging 31.1 points a game during the regular season) to just 17 points, well below the Cowboys' average. This included five sacks, holding the Cowboys to just 77 yards rushing, and one interception, which led to a 49ers touchdown on the next play. The 49ers dominated most of the game, leading 23–7 entering the fourth quarter, and retaining the lead despite a close comeback from the Cowboys. With the win, the 49ers improved their playoff record against the Cowboys to 3–5 all time and defeated the Cowboys for the first time since 2014.

==== NFC Divisional Playoffs: at (1) Green Bay Packers ====
NFC Divisional Playoffs: (6) San Francisco 49ers at (1) Green Bay Packers – Game summary

Quarter	1	2	3	4	Total
49ers	0	0	3	10	13
Packers	7	0	0	3	10

at Lambeau Field, Green Bay, Wisconsin

- Date: January 22, 2022
- Game time: 7:15 p.m. CST/5:15 p.m. PST
- Game weather: Cloudy, 14 °F (−10 °C)
- Game attendance: 79,132
- Referee: Ronald Torbert
- TV announcers (Fox): Joe Buck, Troy Aikman, Erin Andrews and Tom Rinaldi
- Recap, Game Book

Game information

First quarter

- GB – A. J. Dillon 6-yard run (Mason Crosby kick), 9:25. Packers 7–0. Drive: 10 plays, 69 yards, 5:35.

Second quarter

- No scoring plays

Third quarter

- SF – Robbie Gould 29-yard field goal, 8:13. Packers 7–3. Drive: 10 plays, 39 yards, 6:47.

Fourth quarter

- GB – Mason Crosby 33-yard field goal, 11:27. Packers 10–3. Drive: 14 plays, 57 yards, 9:01.
- SF – Talanoa Hufanga 6-yard blocked punt return (Robbie Gould kick), 4:41. Tied 10–10.
- SF – Robbie Gould 45-yard field goal, 0:00. 49ers 13–10. Drive: 9 plays, 44 yards, 3:20.

Top passers

- SF – Jimmy Garoppolo – 11/19, 131 yards, INT
- GB – Aaron Rodgers – 20/29, 225 yards

Top rushers

- SF – Elijah Mitchell – 17 rushes, 53 yards
- GB – Aaron Jones – 12 rushes, 41 yards

Top receivers

- SF – George Kittle – 4 receptions, 63 yards
- GB – Aaron Jones – 9 receptions, 129 yards

The 49ers' Cinderella run continued as they traveled to Lambeau Field and pulled off the upset in a 13–10 win over the heavily favored Green Bay Packers. The game, which was affected by snowfall, was a defensive battle. The Packers started the game with a six-yard touchdown run by AJ Dillion to take a 7–0 lead. For the rest of the game, the 49ers defense only surrendered three more points, aided by five sacks, a fumble recovery, and only giving up 263 total yards of offense to the Packers. The 49ers special teams was pivotal, as they blocked a Packers field goal right before halftime, returned a blocked punt for a game-tying touchdown late in the game, and finally, converted a game-winning field goal by kicker Robbie Gould as time expired, the last of which advanced them to their second NFC Championship in the last three seasons and the 17th NFC Championship overall as a franchise. With the Tennessee Titans' loss earlier in the day to the Cincinnati Bengals, coincidentally also on a field goal as time expired, this was the first time since 2010 that both #1 seeded teams were eliminated in the same weekend. With the win, the 49ers improved to 4–0 in the playoffs against Packers quarterback Aaron Rodgers. The 49ers recorded five sacks for the second game in a row, which is the first time that has happened in consecutive playoff games since the 1984 season.

==== NFC Championship: at (4) Los Angeles Rams ====
NFC Championship: (6) San Francisco 49ers at (4) Los Angeles Rams – Game summary

Quarter	1	2	3	4	Total
49ers	0	10	7	0	17
Rams	0	7	0	13	20

at SoFi Stadium, Inglewood, California

- Date: January 30
- Game time: 3:40 p.m. PST
- Game weather: Sunny, 62 °F (17 °C)
- Game attendance: 73,202
- Referee: Carl Cheffers
- TV announcers (Fox): Joe Buck, Troy Aikman, Erin Andrews, and Tom Rinaldi
- Recap, Game Book

Game information

First quarter

- No scoring plays.

Second quarter

- LAR – Cooper Kupp 16-yard pass from Matthew Stafford (Matt Gay kick), 8:46. Rams 7–0. Drive: 18 plays, 97 yards, 9:33.
- SF – Deebo Samuel 44-yard pass from Jimmy Garoppolo (Robbie Gould kick), 6:10. Tied 7–7. Drive: 4 plays, 75 yards, 2:36.
- SF – Robbie Gould 38-yard field goal, 0:00. 49ers 10–7. Drive: 8 plays, 36 yards, 1:50.

Third quarter

- SF – George Kittle 16-yard pass from Jimmy Garoppolo (Robbie Gould kick), 1:59. 49ers 17–7. Drive: 10 plays, 58 yards, 5:54.

Fourth quarter

- LAR – Cooper Kupp 11-yard pass from Matthew Stafford (Matt Gay kick), 13:30. 49ers 17–14. Drive: 7 plays, 75 yards, 3:29.
- LAR – Matt Gay 40-yard field goal, 6:49. Tied 17–17. Drive: 9 plays, 63 yards, 3:06.
- LAR – Matt Gay 30-yard field goal, 1:46. Rams 20–17. Drive: 10 plays, 49 yards, 4:40.

Top passers

- SF – Jimmy Garoppolo – 16/30, 232 yards, 2 TD, INT
- LAR – Matthew Stafford – 31/45, 337 yards, 2 TD, INT

Top rushers

- SF – Deebo Samuel – 7 rushes, 26 yards
- LAR – Cam Akers – 13 rushes, 48 yards

Top receivers

- SF – Deebo Samuel – 4 receptions, 72 yards, TD
- LAR – Cooper Kupp – 11 receptions, 142 yards, 2 TD

The 49ers flew to Los Angeles following their win over the Packers to play their division rival Los Angeles Rams in the NFC Championship Game. During the regular season, the 49ers won both games against the Rams, and were looking to complete the season sweep with a win.

San Francisco won the coin toss and elected to defer. The two teams traded punts before Rams quarterback Matthew Stafford drove the offense to the 49ers' 3-yard line before throwing a drive-ending interception to Jimmie Ward. However, the 49ers were unable to muster any points off the pick, and were forced to punt. In the second quarter, the Rams struck first with Stafford completing a touchdown pass to wide receiver Cooper Kupp from 16 yards out to give the Rams a 7–0 lead. However, San Francisco struck right back with Jimmy Garoppolo hitting Deebo Samuel for a 44-yard touchdown to tie the game up at 7. On the Rams' next drive, the Rams drove to the 49ers' 38-yard line, but could only pick up 2 yards over the next three downs, and kicker Matt Gay's 54-yard field goal attempt sailed wide of the goalposts. With just under two minutes remaining in the first half, Garoppolo completed four straight passes to set up kicker Robbie Gould's 38-yard field goal at the end of the half to put San Francisco up 10–7.

In the second half, the two teams once again traded punts. On the 49ers' second drive of the half, short runs by Samuel and short passes by Garoppolo drove San Francisco down to the Rams' 16-yard line, where he hooked up with tight end George Kittle for a touchdown to make the score 17–7. On the Rams' ensuing drive, long passes by Stafford led to Kupp's second touchdown of the game from 11 yards out to cut the deficit to 17–14 with thirteen minutes left. On the 49ers' next two drives, they were forced to punt. The Rams capitalized, with Gay scoring two field goals from 40 and 30 yards out respectively to make the score 20–17 in favor of Los Angeles.

With just under two minutes remaining, the 49ers' offense trotted out on the field in an attempt to make a desperate last-minute drive to tie the game. After an incompletion on first down, Garoppolo completed a pass to Jauan Jennings, but was tackled immediately by the Rams' Travin Howard to bring up a 3rd-and-13 on the 49ers' 22-yard line. On the very next play, Garoppolo was washed out of the pocket by the Rams' defensive line. Defensive tackle Aaron Donald got a hand on Garoppolo, and in desperation, Garoppolo lobbed the ball up, where it was tipped by JaMycal Hasty before falling into the hands of Howard for a game and season-ending interception. Three kneeldowns by Stafford ended the game, and sent the Rams to their second Super Bowl in the last 4 years.

== Statistics ==
=== Team ===
Category	Total yards	Yards per game	NFL rank (out of 32)
Passing offense	4,221	248.3	12th
Rushing offense	2,166	127.4	7th
Total offense	6,387	375.7	7th
Passing defense	3,510	206.5	6th
Rushing defense	1,760	103.5	7th
Total defense	5,270	310.0	3rd

=== Individual ===
Category	Player	Total yards
Offense
Passing	Jimmy Garoppolo	3,810
Rushing	Elijah Mitchell	963
Receiving	Deebo Samuel	1,405
Defense
Tackles (Solo)	Fred Warner	79
Sacks	Nick Bosa	15.5
Interceptions	Jimmie Ward	2

Statistics correct as of the end of the 2021 NFL season
