= Deommodore Lenoir =

American football player (born 1999)

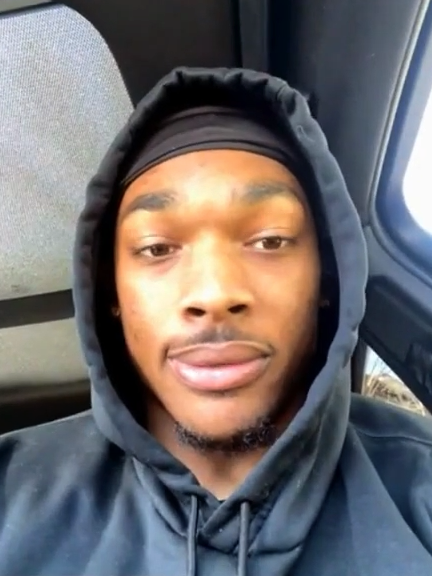
- Lenoir in 2021

No. 2 – San Francisco 49ers
- Position: Cornerback
- Roster status: Active

Personal information
- Born: October 6, 1999 (age 27); Los Angeles, California, U.S.
- Listed height: 5 ft 10 in (1.78 m)
- Listed weight: 200 lb (91 kg)

Career information
- High school: Salesian (Los Angeles)
- College: Oregon (2017–2020)
- NFL draft: 2021: 5th round, 172nd overall pick

Career history
- San Francisco 49ers (2021–present)

Career NFL statistics as of Week 3, 2026
- Total tackles: 341
- Sacks: 1.0
- Pass deflections: 32
- Interceptions: 8
- Forced fumbles: 1
- Touchdowns: 1
- Stats at Pro Football Reference

Deommodore Lenoir (born October 6, 1999) is an American professional football cornerback for the San Francisco 49ers of the National Football League (NFL). He played college football for the Oregon Ducks, and was selected by the 49ers in the fifth round of the 2021 NFL draft.

== Professional career ==
=== Pre-draft ===
On September 9, 2020, Lenoir announced his decision to forgo his senior season and declared himself eligible for the 2021 NFL Draft. He received an invitation to play in the 2021 East–West Shrine Bowl, before it was ultimately cancelled due to COVID-19. NFL.com lead analyst Lance Zierlein projected Lenoir would be selected in the sixth or seventh round. Bleacher Report had him ranked as the 15th best cornerback prospect available in the draft and projected him to be a fourth round pick. Pro Football Focus had Lenoir ranked as the 23rd best cornerback on their big board (162nd overall).

Pre-draft measurables
Height	Weight	Arm length	Hand span	Wingspan	40-yard dash	10-yard split	20-yard split	20-yard shuttle	Three-cone drill	Vertical jump	Broad jump	Bench press
5 ft 10 1/4 in (1.78 m)	199 lb (90 kg)	30 5/8 in (0.78 m)	9 3/4 in (0.25 m)	6 ft 3 1/8 in (1.91 m)	4.45 s	1.52 s	2.54 s	4.34 s	7.02 s	34.5 in (0.88 m)	10 ft 1 in (3.07 m)	15 reps
All values from Pro Day

=== 2021 ===
The San Francisco 49ers selected Lenoir in the fifth round (172nd overall) of the 2021 NFL draft. He was the second cornerback drafted by the 49ers after third round pick (102nd overall) Ambry Thomas and was the 25th cornerback drafted in 2021.

External videos
- 49ers select Deommodore Lenoir No. 172
- 49ers call Deommodore Lenoir

On May 13, 2021, the 49ers signed Lenoir to a four-year, $3.76 million rookie contract that included an initial signing bonus of $284,872.

Throughout training camp, Lenoir competed for a roster spot as a backup cornerback against Thomas, Dontae Johnson, Mark Fields II, Ken Webster, and Tim Harris. Head coach Kyle Shanahan named Lenoir a backup cornerback to begin the season and listed him as the fourth cornerback on the depth chart behind Jason Verrett, Emmanuel Moseley, and K'Waun Williams.

On September 12, 2021, Lenoir made his professional regular season debut and first career start in the season-opener at the Detroit Lions in place of Emmanuel Moseley who was inactive due to an injury. He recorded three combined tackles (two solo) during a 41–33 victory. The following week, he collected a season-high five combined tackles (three solo) and a season-high two pass deflections during a 17–11 road victory over the Philadelphia Eagles. He was inactive as a healthy scratch for three games (Weeks 7–9). Lenoir was inactive during a 27–24 overtime victory at the Los Angeles Rams in Week 18 as a healthy scratch.

Lenoir finished his rookie season with 17 combined tackles (12 solo) and two pass deflections in 13 games and two starts. He received an overall grade of 52.1 from Pro Football Focus as a rookie in 2021.

=== 2022 ===
Throughout training camp, he competed to be a starting cornerback against Emmanuel Moseley under defensive coordinator DeMeco Ryans. Head coach Kyle Shanahan named him a backup cornerback to begin the season as the third cornerback on the depth chart behind starting cornerbacks Charvarius Ward and Emmanuel Moseley.

On October 3, 2022, Lenoir made eight combined tackles (five solo) and made the first sack of his career on Matthew Stafford for a nine–yard loss as the 49ers defeated the Los Angeles Rams 24–9. Prior to Week 6, head coach Kyle Shanahan named Lenoir the No. 2 starting cornerback after Emmanuel Moseley was placed on injured reserve due to a torn ACL. On December 4, 2022, Lenoir made one solo tackle, a pass deflection, and had his first career interception on a pass by Tua Tagovailoa to wide receiver Tyreek Hill during a 33–17 win against the Miami Dolphins. In Week 15, he collected a season-high ten combined tackles (nine solo) during a 21–13 win at the Seattle Seahawks. He finished the season with a total of 79 combined tackles (54 solo), one interception, five passes defended, and one sack in 17 games and 13 starts. He earned an overall grade of 60.9 from Pro Football Focus in 2022.

The San Francisco 49ers finished the 2022 NFL season first in the NFC West with a 13–4 record, clinching a playoff berth. On January 14, 2023, Lenoir started in the first playoff game in his career and made five combined tackles (four solo), a pass deflection, and intercepted a pass by Geno Smith to wide receiver Tyler Lockett during a 41–23 win in the Wildcard Round against the Seattle Seahawks. The following week, he recorded five combined tackles (four solo), broke up a pass, and had an interception on a pass by Dak Prescott to wide receiver Michael Gallup during a 19–12 victory against the Dallas Cowboys in the Divisional Round. On January 29, 2023, Lenoir started in the NFC Championship Game and made seven combined tackles (six solo) as the 49ers lost 7–31 at the Philadelphia Eagles.

=== 2023 ===
On February 9, 2023, the San Francisco 49ers hired Steve Wilks to be their new defensive coordinator after DeMeco Ryans accepted the head coaching position with the Houston Texans. Head coach Kyle Shanahan named Lenoir and Charvarius Ward the starting cornerbacks to begin the season.

On September 17, 2023, Lenoir collected a season-high ten combined tackles (eight solo), made one pass deflection, and had an interception on a pass thrown by Matthew Stafford to wide receiver Van Jefferson with less than five minutes left in the fourth quarter to help secure a 30–23 win at the Los Angeles Rams. In Week 17, he made three combined tackles (two solo), tied his season-high of two pass deflections, and set a career-high with his third interception of the season on a pass attempt thrown by Sam Howell to wide receiver Terry McLaurin during a 27–10 win at the Washington Commanders. He started in all 17 games and recorded 84 combined tackles (58 solo), a career-high ten passes defended, and a career-high three interceptions. He received an overall grade of 75.8 from Pro Football Focus in 2023.

The San Francisco 49ers finished the 2023 NFL season a top the NFC West with a record of 12–5 to clinch a first-round bye. The 49ers defeated the Green Bay Packers 24–21 in the Divisional Round and defeated the Detroit Lions 34–31 in the NFC Championship Game, advancing to the Super Bowl. On February 11, 2024, Lenoir started in Super Bowl LVIII and made eight combined tackles (four solo) and a forced fumble as the 49ers lost in overtime 25–22 to the Kansas City Chiefs.

=== 2024 ===
On February 14, 2024, the 49ers fired defensive coordinator Steve Wilks and promoted Nick Sorensen to defensive coordinator in his place. Lenoir and Charvarius Ward returned as the starting cornerbacks to begin the season.

On October 6, 2024, Lenoir produced eight combined tackles (three solo) and returned a blocked field goal 61 yards for his first career touchdown during a 24–23 loss against the Arizona Cardinals. In Week 7, he made eight combined tackles (six solo), a pass deflection, and intercepted a pass by Patrick Mahomes to wide receiver Xavier Worthy during an 18–28 loss to the Kansas City Chiefs.

On November 12, 2024, the 49ers signed Lenoir to a five-year, $88.88 million contract extension that includes $38.35 million guaranteed, $15.85 million guaranteed upon signing, and an initial signing bonus of $13.00 million. Including incentives, the contract has a maximum value of $92 million. He was inactive during a 10–35 loss at the Buffalo Bills in Week 13. A shoulder injury sidelined Lenoir during the 49ers' 24–47 loss at the Arizona Cardinals in Week 18.

Lenoir finished the 2024 season with a total of 85 combined tackles (53 solo), nine pass deflections, and two interceptions in 15 games and starts. His overall grade of 67.3 from Pro Football Focus ranked 71st amongst 222 qualifying cornerbacks.

=== 2025 ===
On January 7, 2025, the 49ers let go of Sorensen and would later hire former defensive coordinator Robert Saleh on the 24th. Lenoir remained the starting cornerback ahead of the season alongside Renardo Green, as Ward departed for the Indianapolis Colts during the offseason.

On October 26, 2025, Lenoir produced three total tackles (two solo) and an interception on C. J. Stroud during the 49ers' 26-15 loss to the Houston Texans. On November 16, Lenoir had seven total tackles (four solo) and an interception returned for 64 yards on Jacoby Brissett in the 49ers' 41-22 victory over the Arizona Cardinals.

Lenoir finished the 2025 season with 61 combined tackles (39 solo), five pass deflections and two interceptions while playing and starting in all 17 games. His snap count of 1,065 ranked third in terms of all cornerbacks across the league and his Pro Football Focus coverage grade of 66.6 ranked 43rd across 114 qualifying cornerbacks. A focal point of his season was his burgeoning rivalry with Seattle Seahawks star wide receiver Jaxon Smith-Njigba, with Lenoir virally headbutting Smith-Njigba during the 49ers' divisional round loss to the Seahawks. Lenoir played 59 coverage snaps against the Seahawks, only allowing 1 Smith-Njigba reception for two yards.

== NFL career statistics ==
Legend
**Bold**	Career high

=== Regular season ===
Year	Team	Games		Tackles					Interceptions						Fumbles				
Year	Team	GP	GS	Cmb	Solo	Ast	Sck	TFL	Int	Yds	Avg	Lng	TD	PD	FF	Fum	FR	Yds	TD
2021	SF	13	2	17	12	5	—	1	—	—	—	—	—	2	—	—	—	—	—
2022	SF	**17**	13	79	54	25	**1.0**	**6**	1	8	8.0	8	—	5	—	—	—	—	—
2023	SF	**17**	**17**	84	**58**	26	—	1	**3**	49	16.3	28	—	**10**	—	—	—	—	—
2024	SF	15	15	**85**	53	**32**	—	2	2	33	16.5	33	—	9	**1**	—	—	—	—
2025	SF	**17**	**17**	61	39	22	—	4	2	**90**	**45**	**64**	—	5	—	**1**	—	—	—
Career		79	64	326	216	110	1.0	14	8	180	22.5	64	—	31	1	1	—	—	—

=== Postseason ===
Year	Team	Games		Tackles					Interceptions						Fumbles				
Year	Team	GP	GS	Cmb	Solo	Ast	Sck	TFL	Int	Yds	Avg	Lng	TD	PD	FF	Fum	FR	Yds	TD
2021	SF	Did not play																	
2022	SF	**3**	**3**	17	**14**	3	—	—	**2**	**12**	**6.0**	**6**	—	**2**	—	—	—	—	—
2023	SF	**3**	**3**	**18**	10	**8**	—	—	—	—	—	—	—	—	**1**	—	—	—	—
2025	SF	2	2	11	7	4	—	**1**	—	—	—	—	—	—	—	—	—	—	—
Career		8	8	46	31	15	—	1	2	12	6.0	6	—	2	1	—	—	—	—

== Legal issues ==
On June 26, 2025 evening, Lenoir was arrested for obstruction of justice in Los Angeles. It was reported that officers approached Lenoir and a man named Marcus Cunningham when they noticed double-parked vehicles blocking traffic and found a gun in the parked car. Cunningham allegedly threw the keys to Lenoir when officers asked for them who also refused to give the keys the officers as well. The following morning Lenoir was released from jail. His court date is scheduled for July 25.
