= Brandon Aiyuk =

American football player (born 1998)

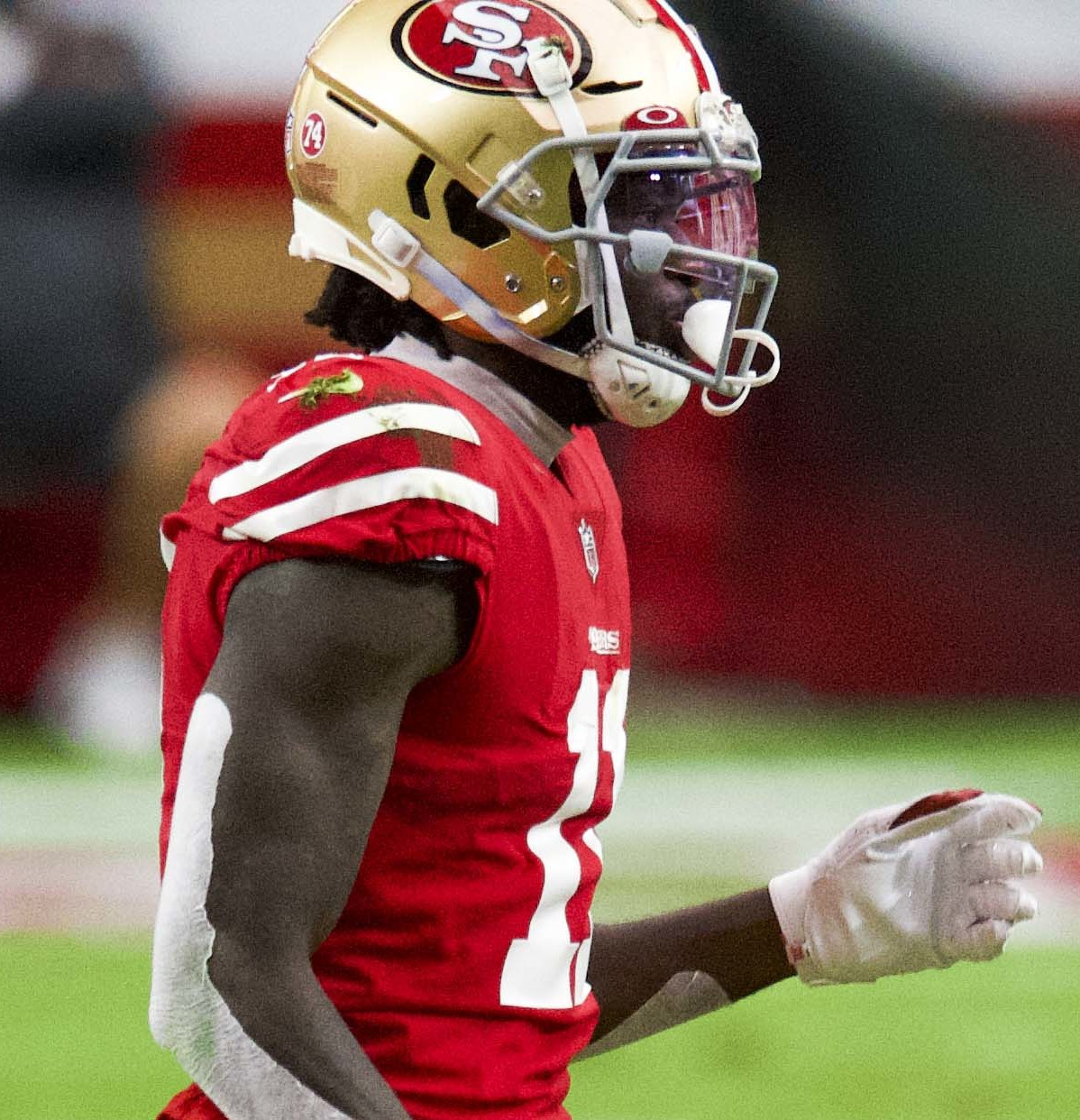
- Aiyuk with the San Francisco 49ers in 2020

San Francisco 49ers
- Position: Wide receiver
- Roster status: Reserve/left squad

Personal information
- Born: March 17, 1998 (age 28); Rocklin, California, U.S.
- Listed height: 6 ft 0 in (1.83 m)
- Listed weight: 200 lb (91 kg)

Career information
- High school: Robert McQueen (Reno, Nevada)
- College: Sierra (2016–2017); Arizona State (2018–2019)
- NFL draft: 2020: 1st round, 25th overall pick

Career history
- San Francisco 49ers (2020–present)

Awards and highlights
- Second-team All-Pro (2023); Junior College All-American (2017); First-team All-Pac-12 (2019); 2× First-team All-NorCal (2016, 2017)

Career NFL statistics as of 2025
- Receptions: 294
- Receiving yards: 4,305
- Touchdowns: 25
- Stats at Pro Football Reference

Brandon Aiyuk (EYE-yook; born March 17, 1998) is an American professional football wide receiver for the San Francisco 49ers of the National Football League (NFL). He played college football for the Sierra College Wolverines and Arizona State Sun Devils and was selected by the 49ers in the first round of the 2020 NFL draft.

== Early life ==
Aiyuk was born in Rocklin, California, and is of Cameroonian descent. Growing up in Reno, Nevada, Aiyuk attended Robert McQueen High School. There, he played wide receiver and defensive back and also returned kicks for the Lancers and was named first-team All-Northern Nevada and honorable mention All-State as a senior.

== College career ==
=== Sierra College ===
==== 2016 season ====
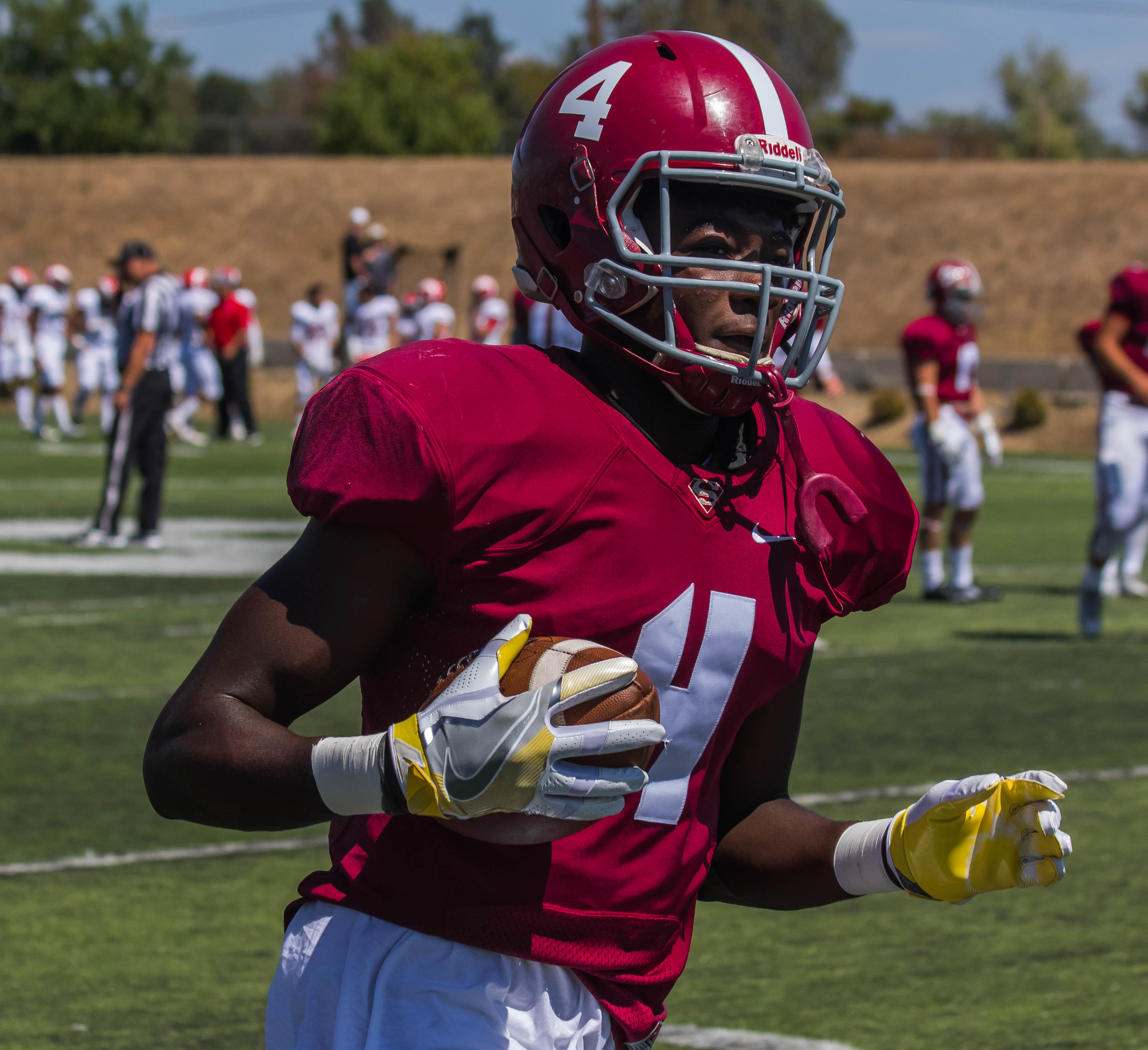
Aiyuk in 2016

Aiyuk began his college football career at Sierra College in Rocklin, California. As a freshman, he caught 29 passes for 573 yards and five touchdowns for the Wolverines and was named All-NorCal Conference.

==== 2017 season ====
Aiyuk was named a Junior College All-American as a sophomore after recording 60 receptions for 960 yards and 14 touchdowns while also returning 11 kickoffs for 418 yards and two touchdowns and 14 punts for 313 yards and a touchdown. He finished his junior college career with 2,499 all-purpose yards and 21 touchdowns. Aiyuk was named First-Team All-NorCal Conference and All-State after the season.

Aiyuk committed to transfer to Arizona State University for the final two years of his NCAA eligibility over offers from Colorado State, Kansas, Tennessee, and Alabama. He chose Arizona State because it was one of the few schools that recruited him to play wide receiver; others recruited him as only a return specialist or planned to move him to the defensive side of the ball.

=== Arizona State ===
==== 2018 season ====
In his first year with the Sun Devils, Aiyuk had 33 catches for 474 yards and three touchdowns with an additional 381 total return yards.

==== 2019 season ====
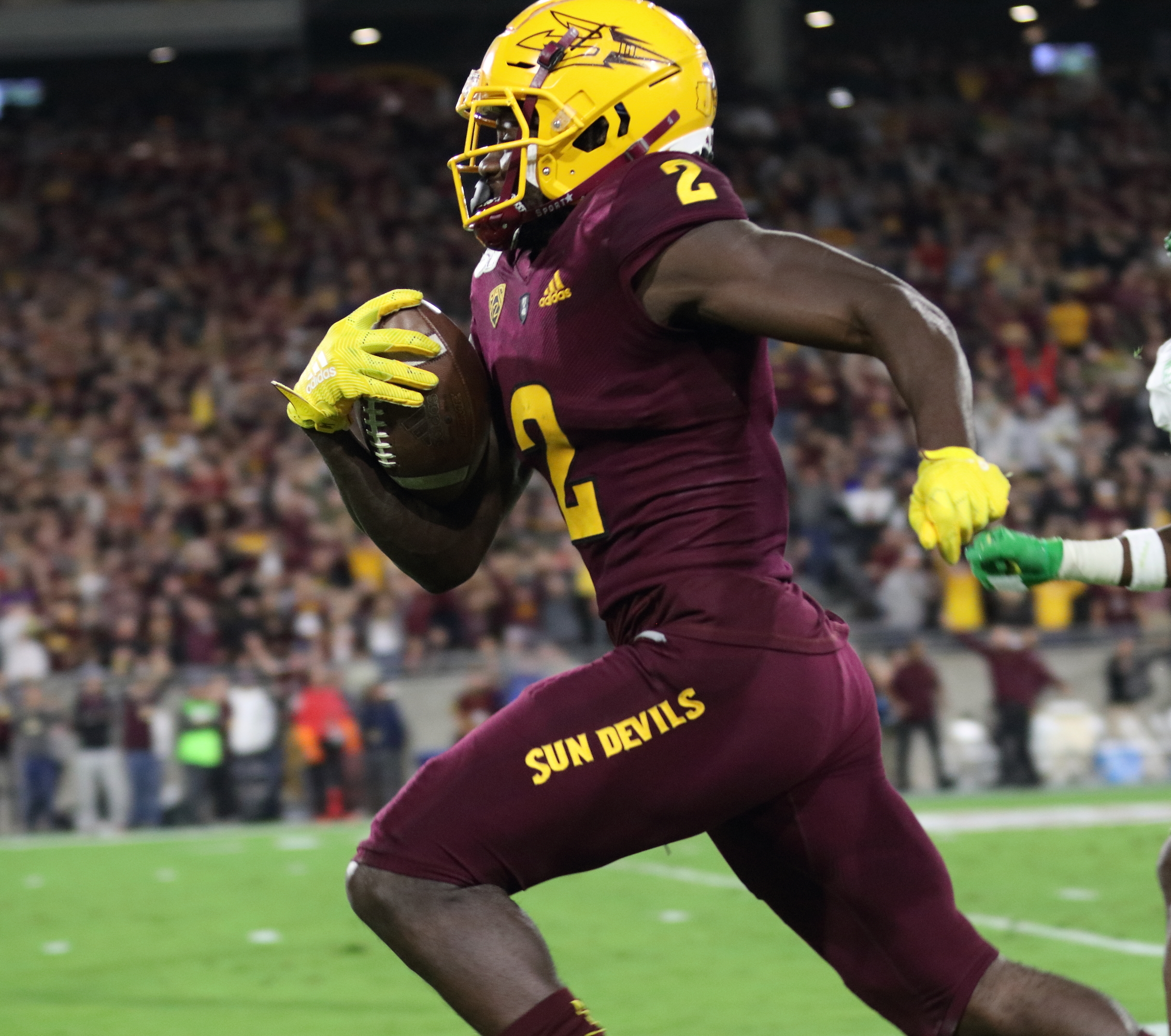
Aiyuk in 2019

Aiyuk was named first-team preseason All-Pac-12 Conference going into his senior year. He was named the Pac-12 Offensive Player of the Week after catching seven passes for 196 yards and three touchdowns in a 38–34 victory over Washington State on October 12, 2019. Aiyuk was also named the conference Special Teams Player of the Week after posting 44 kickoff return yards and 76 punt return yards, 63 of which came on his first return for a touchdown at ASU, against Oregon State on November 16. He also had a career-high 10 receptions for 173 yards and a touchdown in the game and his 293 all-purpose yards were the fifth-most in a single game in school history.

Aiyuk finished the season with 65 receptions for 1,192 yards and eight touchdowns, returned 14 punts for 226 yards and a touchdown and 14 kickoffs for 446 yards, and was named first-team All-Pac-12 as both a wide receiver and as a return specialist.

== Professional career ==
Pre-draft measurables
Height	Weight	Arm length	Hand span	Wingspan	40-yard dash	10-yard split	20-yard split	Vertical jump	Broad jump	Bench press	Wonderlic
5 ft 11 5/8 in (1.82 m)	205 lb (93 kg)	33 1/2 in (0.85 m)	9 3/4 in (0.25 m)	6 ft 8 in (2.03 m)	4.50 s	1.52 s	2.63 s	40.0 in (1.02 m)	10 ft 8 in (3.25 m)	11 reps	23
All values from NFL Combine

=== 2020 season ===
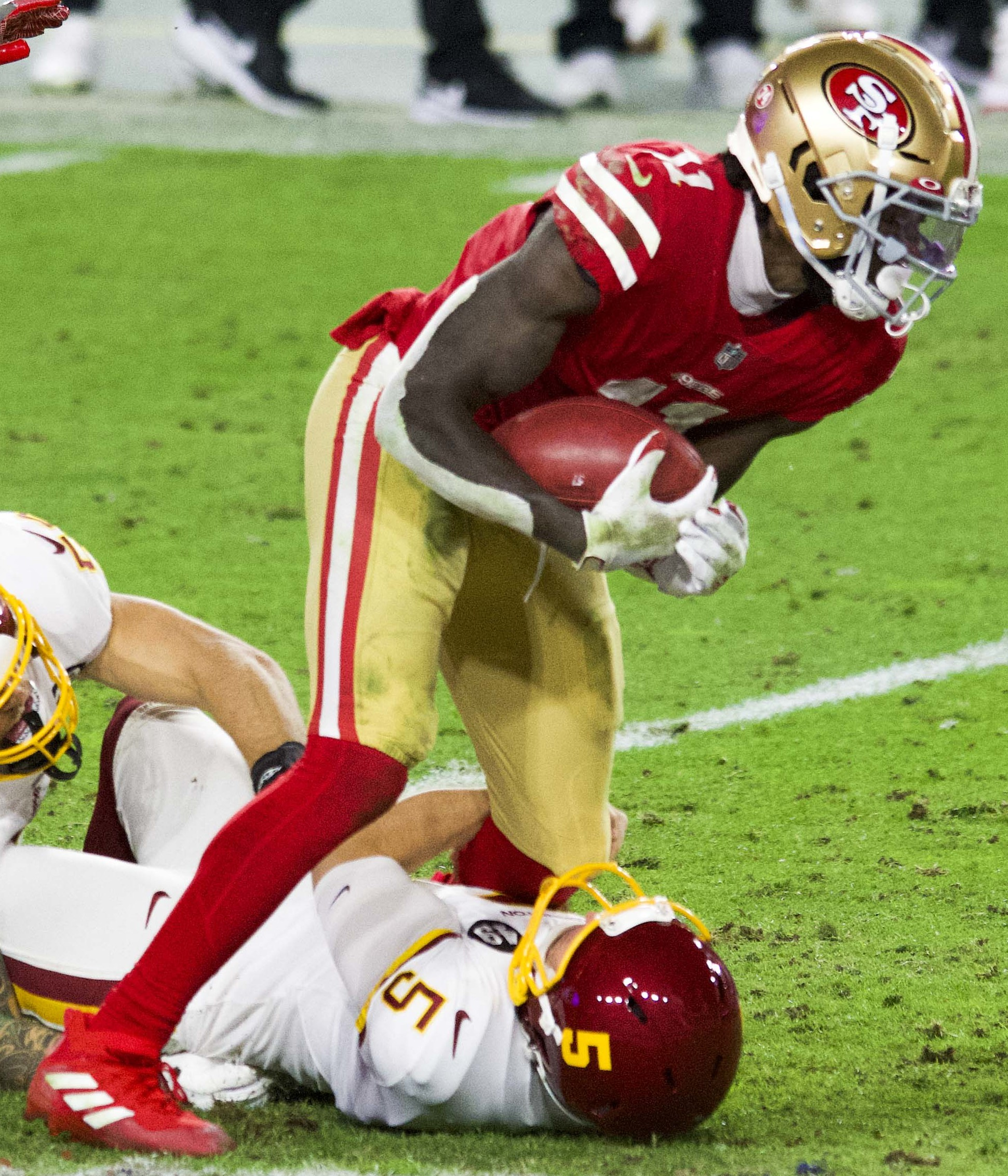
Aiyuk in 2020

Aiyuk was selected by the San Francisco 49ers in the first round (25th overall) in the 2020 NFL draft, acquired in a trade with the Minnesota Vikings for San Francisco's 31st (Jeff Gladney), 117th (D.J. Wonnum) and 176th (K.J. Osborn) picks. On June 26, 2020, he signed a four-year, $12.5 million contract with a $6.6 million signing bonus.

On August 23, Aiyuk sustained a hamstring injury in training camp, resulting in him being inactive for the season-opener. Aiyuk made his NFL debut during Week 2 against the New York Jets and recorded two receptions for 21 yards in the 31–13 road victory. In the next game against the New York Giants, Aiyuk recorded 101 all-purpose yards and his first career rushing touchdown during the 36–9 road victory. Aiyuk became the franchise's first wide receiver since 1970 to have a rushing touchdown be their first career score. During Week 4 against the Philadelphia Eagles on NBC Sunday Night Football, he had a 38-yard rushing touchdown in the 20–25 loss. Aiyuk became the first wide receiver since the AFL-NFL merger (1970) to record two rushing touchdowns in their first three professional games.

During Week 7, Aiyuk recorded his first career game with 100+ receiving yards, catching six passes for 115 yards, in a 33–6 road victory over the New England Patriots. On November 4, Aiyuk was placed on the reserve/COVID-19 list by the team, and was re-activated two days later. He was placed back on the COVID-19 list on November 20, following a Week 10 start in their 27–13 road loss to the New Orleans Saints, and was re-activated on December 2. During Week 14 against the Washington Football Team, Aiyuk recorded 10 catches for 119 yards in the 23–15 loss. In 12 games and 11 starts in his rookie season, Aiyuk finished with 60 receptions for 748 yards and five touchdowns, as well as a career-high two rushing touchdowns prior to Week 5.

=== 2021 season ===
Aiyuk played in all 17 regular-season games with 16 starts for the 49ers, the exception being a Week 1 win against the Detroit Lions where he only contributed a punt return for seven yards. He finished the season with 56 receptions for 826 yards and five touchdowns.

=== 2022 season ===
In Week 17 against the Las Vegas Raiders, Aiyuk had nine receptions for 101 yards and a touchdown, as well as a single carry for 16 yards, during the 37–34 overtime road victory. For the season, Aiyuk played in 17 games and starts, recording 78 receptions for 1,015 yards and a career-high eight touchdowns.

=== 2023 season ===
On April 28, 2023, the 49ers picked up the fifth-year option of Aiyuk's rookie contract. During the season opener against the Pittsburgh Steelers, Aiyuk had eight receptions for 129 yards and two touchdowns in a 30–7 road victory, earning NFC Offensive Player of the Week. In the next game against the Los Angeles Rams, he injured his shoulder on his first catch of the game. Despite continuing play, Aiyuk was designated as inactive for their Week 3 match against the New York Giants. During a Week 4 victory over the Arizona Cardinals, he had six receptions for 148 yards. In a Week 11 victory over the Buccaneers, he had five receptions for 156 yards and a touchdown. Aiyuk started in all 16 games he played in. He had seven total games going over 100 receiving yards. He finished with 75 receptions for 1,342 yards and seven touchdowns, and earned his first career All-Pro selection as a second-team wide receiver.

During the NFC Championship Game against the Lions, Aiyuk had a receiving touchdown. In the third quarter of the game, he recorded a 51-yard reception from a pass that was deflected off of Kindle Vildor's helmet that helped get the 49ers into scoring position. In Super Bowl LVIII, Aiyuk had three receptions for 49 yards in the 25–22 overtime loss to the Kansas City Chiefs.

=== 2024 season ===
On August 30, 2024, Aiyuk signed a four-year, $120 million contract extension with the 49ers. During Week 5 against the Cardinals, he had eight receptions for 147 yards in the narrow 24–23 loss. Two weeks later against the Chiefs, Aiyuk tore his ACL and MCL. He was subsequently ruled out for the remainder of the season.

Aiyuk finished the 2024 season with 25 receptions for 374 yards in seven games and starts.

=== 2025 season ===
On July 18, 2025, Aiyuk was placed on the PUP list as he worked his way back from the knee injuries that he had suffered the previous October.

On November 21, 2025, it was reported that the 49ers voided the guaranteed money in his contract for 2026 due to lack of participation. Aiyuk told the NFL Players Association (NFLPA) he was not interested in filing a grievance. On December 13, the 49ers placed Aiyuk on their reserve/left squad list.

=== 2026 season ===
Aiyuk did not report to training camp in July. He is currently on the reserve/did not report list, meaning the 49ers are not paying him and he does not count against their roster. To play again, Aiyuk must apply for reinstatement with the NFL. On November 2, 2026, it was reported that Aiyuk hired Drew Rosenhaus as his agent. On November 9, Aiyuk was reinstated to the 49ers.

== Career statistics ==
Legend
**Bold**	Career high

=== NFL ===
==== Regular season ====
Year	Team	Games		Receiving					Rushing					Fumbles	
Year	Team	GP	GS	Rec	Yds	Y/R	Lng	TD	Att	Yds	Y/A	Lng	TD	Fum	Lost
2020	SF	12	11	60	748	12.2	49	5	**6**	**77**	**12.8**	**38T**	**2**	0	0
2021	SF	17	16	56	826	14.8	43	5	5	17	3.4	8	0	**2**	**1**
2022	SF	17	17	**78**	1,015	13.0	54	**8**	2	23	11.5	16	0	1	**1**
2023	SF	16	16	75	**1,342**	**17.9**	**76**	7	0	0	0.0	0	0	1	**1**
2024	SF	7	7	25	374	15.0	53	0	0	0	0.0	0	0	0	0
2025	SF	0	0	DNP											
Career		69	67	294	4,305	14.6	76	25	13	117	9.0	38T	2	4	3

==== Postseason ====
Year	Team	Games		Receiving					Fumbles	
Year	Team	GP	GS	Rec	Yds	Y/R	Lng	TD	Fum	Lost
2021	SF	3	3	**9**	135	15.0	37	0	0	0
2022	SF	3	3	6	109	**18.2**	31	0	0	0
2023	SF	3	3	**9**	**149**	16.6	**51**	**1**	0	0
2025	SF	0	0	DNP						
Career		9	9	24	393	16.4	51	1	0	0

=== College ===
Year	Team	GP	Receiving				Rushing				Kick returning				Punt returning			
Year	Team	GP	Rec	Yds	Avg	TD	Att	Yds	Avg	TD	Ret	Yds	Avg	TD	Ret	Yds	Avg	TD
2016	Sierra College	10	29	573	**19.8**	5	1	−1	−1.0	0	11	163	14.8	0	3	14	4.7	0
2017	Sierra College	10	60	960	16.0	**14**	**13**	**59**	4.5	**1**	11	418	**38.0**	**2**	**14**	**313**	**22.4**	**1**
2018	Arizona State	13	33	474	14.4	3	—	—	—	—	**15**	339	22.6	0	11	67	6.1	0
2019	Arizona State	12	**65**	**1,192**	18.3	8	1	6	**6.0**	0	14	**446**	31.9	0	**14**	226	16.1	**1**
NCAA totals		25	98	1,666	17	11	1	6	6	0	29	785	27.1	0	25	293	11.7	1
NJCAA totals		20	89	1,533	17.2	19	14	58	4.1	1	22	581	26.4	2	17	327	19.2	1

== Personal life ==
Aiyuk married Rochelle Searight in April 2025. They started dating in 2018 while attending Arizona State University, and their son was born in September 2020.

On December 20, 2025, Aiyuk posted a video of himself speeding past Levi's Stadium, reportedly going over 100 mph. After this incident, Aiyuk apologized for his actions. In June 2026, an arrest warrant was issued for the speeding incident.
