= Ambry Thomas =

American football player (born 1999)

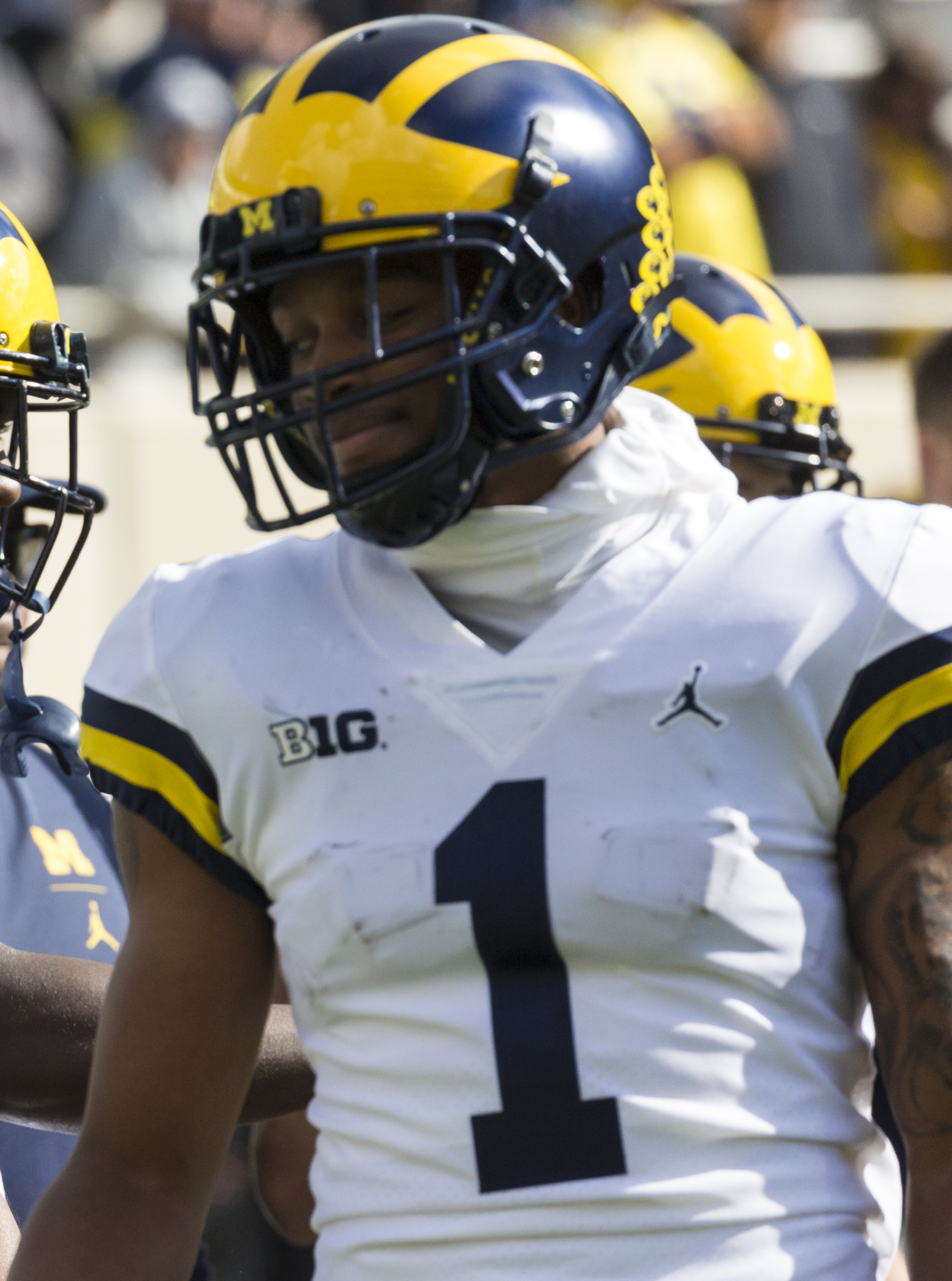
- Thomas with the Michigan Wolverines in 2018

Profile
- Position: Cornerback

Personal information
- Born: September 9, 1999 (age 27); Detroit, Michigan, U.S.
- Listed height: 6 ft 0 in (1.83 m)
- Listed weight: 190 lb (86 kg)

Career information
- High school: Martin Luther King (Detroit)
- College: Michigan (2017–2020)
- NFL draft: 2021: 3rd round, 102nd overall pick

Career history
- San Francisco 49ers (2021–2024); Indianapolis Colts (2024)*; Minnesota Vikings (2024)*; Philadelphia Eagles (2025)
- * Offseason or practice squad member only

Career NFL statistics as of 2025
- Total tackles: 79
- Forced fumbles: 1
- Fumble recoveries: 1
- Pass deflections: 12
- Interceptions: 2
- Stats at Pro Football Reference

Ambry Thomas (born September 9, 1999) is an American professional football cornerback. He played college football for the Michigan Wolverines and was selected by the San Francisco 49ers in the third round of the 2021 NFL draft. Thomas has also been a member of the Indianapolis Colts and Minnesota Vikings.

== Early life ==
Thomas attended Martin Luther King High School in Detroit, Michigan. He played wide receiver and cornerback. Thomas played in the 2017 U.S. Army All-American Bowl. He committed to the University of Michigan to play college football.

== College career ==
Thomas spent his first two years at Michigan in 2017 and 2018 as a backup, recording 16 tackles and an interception during the two years. Prior to the 2019 season, Thomas spent a month in the hospital after being diagnosed with colitis. After believing that he would have to sit out the year due to the condition, Thomas returned and became a starter for the first time. He started all 13 games and had 38 tackles and three interceptions that season. Thomas opted out of the 2020 season and entered the 2021 NFL draft.

== Professional career ==
Pre-draft measurables
| Height | Weight | Arm length | Hand span | Wingspan | 40-yard dash | 10-yard split | 20-yard split | Vertical jump | Broad jump | Bench press |
|---|---|---|---|---|---|---|---|---|---|---|
| 5 ft 11 7/8 in (1.83 m) | 191 lb (87 kg) | 32 1/4 in (0.82 m) | 8 5/8 in (0.22 m) | 6 ft 3 1/4 in (1.91 m) | 4.40 s | 1.58 s | 2.57 s | 38.0 in (0.97 m) | 10 ft 2 in (3.10 m) | 15 reps |
All values from Pro Day

=== San Francisco 49ers ===
==== 2021 season ====
Thomas was selected by the San Francisco 49ers in the third round (102nd overall) of the 2021 NFL draft. He signed his four-year rookie contract on July 26, 2021.

Thomas made his NFL debut in the season-opener against the Detroit Lions and finished the 41–33 road victory with two tackles. During Week 14 against the Cincinnati Bengals, Thomas recorded a season-high six tackles in 26–23 overtime road victory. In the next game against the Atlanta Falcons, he had two tackles and a pass deflection during the 31–13 victory.

During a Week 16 20–17 road loss to the Tennessee Titans on Thursday Night Football, Thomas recorded a tackle and two pass deflections. In the next game against the Houston Texans, he had four tackles and a pass deflection during the 23–7 victory. During the regular-season finale on the road against the Los Angeles Rams, Thomas recorded a pass deflection and his first career interception off of quarterback Matthew Stafford in overtime with the 49ers leading 27–24, sending the 49ers to the playoffs.

Thomas finished his rookie year with 23 tackles, five pass deflections, and an interception in 12 games and five starts. During the Wild Card Round against the Dallas Cowboys, Thomas made his postseason debut and finished the 23–17 road victory with three tackles and a pass deflection. During the NFC Championship Game against the Rams, Thomas had a team-high 13 tackles in the 20–17 road loss.

==== 2022 season ====
In 2022, Thomas struggled during preseason training camp and was in danger of missing the final 53-man roster due to injury and the rise to prominence of rookie cornerbacks Deommodore Lenoir and Samuel Womack. Although he made the final roster, Thomas played just 47 defensive snaps over the course of the season and did not play in the playoffs due to an ankle injury.

Thomas finished his second professional season with 13 tackles in 15 games and no starts.

==== 2023 season ====
During the season-opener against the Pittsburgh Steelers, Thomas recorded five tackles and a pass deflection in the 30–7 road victory. During a Week 10 34–3 road victory over the Jacksonville Jaguars, he had three tackles, a forced fumble, and a fumble recovery. Two weeks later against the Seattle Seahawks on Thanksgiving, Thomas recorded a tackle, two pass deflections, and an interception in the 31–13 road victory.

During a Week 13 42–19 road victory over the Philadelphia Eagles, Thomas set season-highs in tackles with seven and pass deflections with three. Three weeks later against the Baltimore Ravens on Christmas Day, he had four tackles and a pass deflection in the 33–19 loss.

Thomas finished the 2023 season with 43 tackles, seven pass deflections, an interception, a forced fumble, and a fumble recovery in 15 games and six starts. The 49ers finished atop the NFC West with a 12–5 record and qualified for the playoffs as the #1-seed. In the Divisional Round against the Green Bay Packers, Thomas recorded five tackles during the 24–21 victory. During the NFC Championship Game against the Lions, he had six tackles in the 34–31 comeback victory as the 49ers advanced to Super Bowl LVIII. In the Super Bowl against the Kansas City Chiefs, Thomas recorded no statistics during the 25–22 overtime loss.

==== 2024 season ====
Thomas was placed on injured reserve on August 28, 2024. He was released by the 49ers on December 17.

=== Indianapolis Colts ===
On December 18, 2024, Thomas was claimed off waivers by the Indianapolis Colts, but was released the next day after failing his physical.

=== Minnesota Vikings ===
On December 24, 2024, Thomas was signed to the Minnesota Vikings' practice squad. He signed a reserve/future contract with Minnesota on January 16, 2025.

On August 26, 2025, Thomas was released by the Vikings as part of final roster cuts.

=== Philadelphia Eagles ===
On August 29, 2025, Thomas was signed to the Philadelphia Eagles' practice squad. He was released by the Eagles on January 6, 2026. Thomas signed a reserve/future contract with Philadelphia on January 20.

On August 29, 2026, Thomas was released by the Eagles as a part of final roster cuts.

== NFL career statistics ==
Legend
| **Bold** | Career high |

=== Regular season ===
| Year | Team | Games | | Tackles | | | | Interceptions | | | | | | Fumbles | | | |
| Year | Team | GP | GS | Comb | Total | Ast | Sack | PD | Int | Yds | Avg | Lng | TD | FF | FR | Yds | TD |
|---|---|---|---|---|---|---|---|---|---|---|---|---|---|---|---|---|---|
| 2021 | SF | 12 | 5 | 23 | 17 | 6 | 0.0 | 5 | **1** | 0 | 0.0 | 0 | 0 | 0 | 0 | 0 | 0 |
| 2022 | SF | **15** | 0 | 13 | 9 | 4 | 0.0 | 0 | 0 | 0 | 0.0 | 0 | 0 | 0 | 0 | 0 | 0 |
| 2023 | SF | **15** | **6** | **43** | **35** | **8** | 0.0 | **6** | **1** | **2** | **2.0** | **2** | 0 | **1** | **1** | **26** | 0 |
| Career | | 42 | 11 | 79 | 61 | 18 | 0.0 | 11 | 2 | 2 | 1.0 | 2 | 0 | 1 | 1 | 26 | 0 |

=== Postseason ===
| Year | Team | Games | | Tackles | | | | Interceptions | | | | | | Fumbles | | | |
| Year | Team | GP | GS | Comb | Total | Ast | Sack | PD | INT | Yds | Avg | Lng | TD | FF | FR | Yds | TD |
|---|---|---|---|---|---|---|---|---|---|---|---|---|---|---|---|---|---|
| 2021 | SF | 2 | **2** | **16** | **13** | **3** | 0.0 | **1** | 0 | 0 | 0 | 0 | 0 | 0 | 0 | 0 | 0 |
| 2022 | SF | 0 | 0 | Did not play due to injury | | | | | | | | | | | | | |
| 2023 | SF | **3** | **2** | 11 | 8 | **3** | 0.0 | 0 | 0 | 0 | 0 | 0 | 0 | 0 | 0 | 0 | 0 |
| Career | | 2 | 2 | 27 | 21 | 6 | 0.0 | 1 | 0 | 0 | 0 | 0 | 0 | 0 | 0 | 0 | 0 |
