= Elijah Mitchell =

American football player (born 1998)

No. 49 – Philadelphia Eagles
- Position: Running back
- Roster status: Practice squad

Personal information
- Born: May 2, 1998 (age 28); Erath, Louisiana, U.S.
- Listed height: 5 ft 10 in (1.78 m)
- Listed weight: 200 lb (91 kg)

Career information
- High school: Erath
- College: Louisiana (2017–2020)
- NFL draft: 2021: 6th round, 194th overall pick

Career history
- San Francisco 49ers (2021–2024); Kansas City Chiefs (2025); New England Patriots (2025)*; Philadelphia Eagles (2026–present)
- * Offseason or practice squad member only

Awards and highlights
- First-team All-Sun Belt (2020); 2× Second-team All-Sun Belt (2018, 2019); First Responder Bowl MVP (2020)

Career NFL statistics as of Week 9, 2026
- Rushing yards: 1,574
- Rushing average: 4.6
- Rushing touchdowns: 9
- Receptions: 38
- Receiving yards: 204
- Receiving touchdowns: 1
- Stats at Pro Football Reference

Elijah I. Mitchell (born May 2, 1998) is an American professional football running back for the Philadelphia Eagles of the National Football League (NFL). He played college football for the Louisiana Ragin' Cajuns and was selected by the San Francisco 49ers in the sixth round of the 2021 NFL draft. Mitchell has also been a member of the Kansas City Chiefs and New England Patriots.

== Early life ==
Mitchell grew up in Erath, Louisiana and attended Erath High School, where he played high school football. As a senior, Mitchell only played in eight games due to injury but still rushed for 1,903 yards and 28 touchdowns. In three seasons as Erath's starting running back, he had 457 carries for 4,045 yards and 50 touchdowns.

== College career ==
Mitchell played college football for his home state of Louisiana at the University of Louisiana at Lafayette.

Mitchell had 42 carries for 257 yards and four touchdowns as a freshman before breaking a bone in his foot and missing the rest of the season.

As a sophomore, Mitchell had 146 carries for 985 yards and 13 touchdowns to go along with 20 receptions for 349 yards and three touchdowns. He was named Second-team All-Sun Belt Conference.

As a junior, Mitchell was again named second-team All-Sun Belt after recording 198 carries for 1,147 yards and 16 touchdowns to go along with 10 receptions for 70 yards and a touchdown.

In his final season with the Cajuns, Mitchell was once again the team's leading running back and was named first-team All-Sun Belt after recording 141 carries for 878 yards and eight touchdowns to go along with 16 receptions for 153 yards.

Mitchell finished his collegiate career with 527 carries for 3,267 yards and 41 touchdowns to go along with 49 receptions for 597 yards and five touchdowns.

=== College statistics ===
Year	G	Rushing				Receiving			
Year	G	Att	Yds	Avg	TD	Rec	Yds	Avg	TD
2017	5	42	257	6.1	4	3	25	8.3	1
2018	13	146	985	6.7	13	20	349	17.5	3
2019	14	198	1,147	5.8	16	10	70	7.0	1
2020	10	141	878	6.2	8	16	153	9.6	0
Career	42	527	3,267	6.2	41	49	597	12.2	5

== Professional career ==
Pre-draft measurables
Height	Weight	Arm length	Hand span	Wingspan	40-yard dash	10-yard split	20-yard split	20-yard shuttle	Three-cone drill	Vertical jump	Broad jump	Bench press
5 ft 10 1/4 in (1.78 m)	201 lb (91 kg)	31 in (0.79 m)	9 1/2 in (0.24 m)	6 ft 3 3/4 in (1.92 m)	4.35 s	1.51 s	2.44 s	4.20 s	6.94 s	37.5 in (0.95 m)	10 ft 8 in (3.25 m)	17 reps
All values from Pro Day

=== San Francisco 49ers ===
==== 2021 season ====
Mitchell was selected by the San Francisco 49ers in the sixth round (194th overall) of the 2021 NFL draft. He signed his four-year rookie contract on May 13, 2021.

Mitchell made his NFL debut in the season-opener against the Detroit Lions and finished the 41–33 road victory with 19 carries for 104 yards and a touchdown. During a Week 7 30–18 loss to the Indianapolis Colts on Sunday Night Football, he had 18 carries for 107 yards and a touchdown. In the next game against the Chicago Bears, Mitchell rushed 18 times for 137 yards and a touchdown during the 33–22 road victory.

During a Week 12 34–26 victory over the Minnesota Vikings, Mitchell recorded 27 carries for 133 yards and a touchdown. During Week 17 against the Houston Texans, he had 21 carries for 119 yards to go along with two receptions for 11 yards and a touchdown in the 23–7 victory. Mitchell also broke the 49ers' single-season rookie rushing record, rushing for 878 yards in 10 games and surpassing Vic Washington's record 811 yards in 14 games from the 1971 season.

Mitchell finished his rookie year with 207 carries for 963 yards and five touchdowns to go along with 19 receptions for 137 yards and a touchdown in 11 games and 10 starts. During the Wild Card Round against the Dallas Cowboys, Mitchell recorded 27 carries for 96 yards and a touchdown in the 23–17 road victory. In the Divisional Round against the Green Bay Packers, he had 17 carries for 53 yards during the 13–10 road victory. During the NFC Championship Game against the Los Angeles Rams, he recorded three receptions for 50 yards in the 20–17 loss.

==== 2022 season ====
On September 13, 2022, Mitchell was placed on injured reserve after suffering a sprained MCL in the season-opener against the Bears. He was activated on November 12. Mitchell tore his MCL in Week 12 against the New Orleans Saints and was placed on injured reserve on December 3. He was activated on January 7, 2023.

In the 2022 season, Mitchell appeared in five games (one start) and had 45 carries for 279 yards and two touchdowns, which both came in the regular-season finale against the Arizona Cardinals. He finished the 38–13 victory with five carries for 55 yards and the two aforementioned touchdowns.

During the Wild Card Round against the Seattle Seahawks, Mitchell recorded two receptions for 25 yards and a touchdown in the 41–23 victory. In the Divisional Round against the Cowboys, he had 14 carries for 51 yards during the 19–12 victory.

==== 2023 season ====
In the 2023 season, Mitchell appeared in 11 games (one start) and recorded 75 carries for 281 yards and two touchdowns, both coming in the last two weeks of the regular season.

During the NFC Championship Game against the Detroit Lions, Mitchell had four carries for seven yards and a touchdown in the 34–31 comeback victory to help the 49ers reach Super Bowl LVIII. In the Super Bowl against the Kansas City Chiefs, he rushed twice for eight yards during the 25–22 overtime loss.

==== 2024 season ====
Mitchell suffered a hamstring injury and was put on season-ending injured reserve on August 27, 2024.

=== Kansas City Chiefs ===
On March 13, 2025, Mitchell signed a one-year contract with the Kansas City Chiefs. He only played in one game before being released on December 20.

=== New England Patriots ===
On December 23, 2025, Mitchell was signed to the New England Patriots' practice squad. He was released on January 14, 2026. On February 11, Mitchell signed a reserve/futures contract with the Patriots.

On April 28, 2026, Mitchell was released by the Patriots.

=== Philadelphia Eagles ===
On June 2, 2026, Mitchell signed with the Philadelphia Eagles. He was released on August 11. On October 16, Mitchell was signed to the Eagles' practice squad.

== NFL career statistics ==
=== Regular season ===
Year	Team	Games		Rushing					Receiving					Fumbles	
Year	Team	GP	GS	Att	Yds	Avg	Lng	TD	Rec	Yds	Avg	Lng	TD	Fum	Lost
2021	SF	11	10	207	963	4.7	39	5	19	137	7.2	14	1	0	0
2022	SF	5	1	45	279	5.6	19	2	3	7	2.3	5	0	0	0
2023	SF	11	1	75	281	3.7	18	2	6	14	2.3	9	0	0	0
2024	SF	0	0	Did not play due to injury											
2025	KC	1	0	0	0	0.0	0	0	0	0	0.0	0	0	0	0
2026	PHI	3	0	17	51	3.0	9	0	10	46	4.6	15	0	0	0
Career		31	12	344	1,574	4.6	39	9	38	204	5.4	15	1	0	0

=== Postseason ===
Year	Team	Games		Rushing					Receiving					Fumbles	
Year	Team	GP	GS	Att	Yds	Avg	Lng	TD	Rec	Yds	Avg	Lng	TD	Fum	Lost
2021	SF	3	2	55	169	3.1	16	1	7	57	8.1	21	0	0	0
2022	SF	2	0	23	53	2.3	13	0	2	25	12.5	18	1	0	0
2023	SF	3	0	6	15	2.5	7	1	0	0	0.0	0	0	0	0
Career		8	2	84	237	2.8	16	2	9	82	9.1	18	1	0	0
