= Mark Fields (cornerback) =

American football player (born 1996)

No. 39
- Position: Cornerback

Personal information
- Born: October 10, 1996 (age 30); Cornelius, North Carolina, U.S.
- Listed height: 5 ft 10 in (1.78 m)
- Listed weight: 181 lb (82 kg)

Career information
- High school: Hough (Cornelius)
- College: Clemson (2015–2018)
- NFL draft: 2019: undrafted

Career history
- Kansas City Chiefs (2019)*; Minnesota Vikings (2019–2020); Houston Texans (2020); San Francisco 49ers (2021)*; Birmingham Stallions (2023); Saskatchewan Roughriders (2023)*
- * Offseason or practice squad member only

Awards and highlights
- USFL champion (2023); 2× CFP national champion (2016, 2018)

Career NFL statistics
- Total tackles: 2
- Stats at Pro Football Reference

Mark Fields II (born October 10, 1996) is an American former professional football player who was a cornerback in the National Football League (NFL). He played college football for the Clemson Tigers.

== College career ==
Fields was a member of the Tigers at Clemson University for four seasons, including the 2016 and 2018 national championship squads. He served mostly as a reserve defensive back, tallying 45 tackles, 13 passes broken up and one interception, which he returned 42 yards for a touchdown, in 48 games played (six starts).

== Professional career ==
=== Kansas City Chiefs ===
Fields signed with the Kansas City Chiefs as an undrafted free agent on April 27, 2019.

=== Minnesota Vikings ===
The Chiefs traded Fields to the Minnesota Vikings for a 2021 seventh-round draft pick on August 31, 2019. He made his NFL debut in the Vikings season opener on September 8, 2019. He was waived by the Vikings on September 14, 2019, and re-signed to the practice squad two days later. He signed a reserve/future contract with the Vikings on January 12, 2020.

Fields was waived by the Vikings during final roster cuts on September 5, 2020, and was signed to the practice squad the next day. He was elevated to the active roster on September 19 for the team's week 2 game against the Indianapolis Colts, and reverted to the practice squad after the game. He was elevated again on September 26 for the week 3 game against the Tennessee Titans, and reverted to the practice squad again following the game. On October 26, 2020, Fields was promoted to the active roster. He was placed on injured reserve on November 6, 2020, after suffering a punctured lung against the Green Bay Packers. He was activated from injured reserve on December 15, 2020, and waived by the Vikings the next day.

=== Houston Texans ===
On December 17, 2020, Fields was claimed off waivers by the Houston Texans. He was waived after the season on March 2, 2021.

=== San Francisco 49ers ===
The San Francisco 49ers claimed Fields off waivers on March 3, 2021. Fields was waived by the 49ers on August 10, 2021.

=== Birmingham Stallions ===
Fields signed with the Birmingham Stallions of the United States Football League on August 22, 2022. He was transferred to the team's inactive list on March 19, 2023. He was released on October 12, 2023.

=== Saskatchewan Roughriders ===
Fields was signed to the practice roster of the Saskatchewan Roughriders of the Canadian Football League on October 18, 2023. He was released on May 11, 2024.

== Personal life ==
Fields is the son of former Pro Bowl linebacker Mark Fields.
