= Ken Webster (American football) =

American football player (born 1996)

No. 31, 35
- Position: Cornerback

Personal information
- Born: June 19, 1996 (age 30); Decatur, Georgia, U.S.
- Listed height: 5 ft 11 in (1.80 m)
- Listed weight: 202 lb (92 kg)

Career information
- High school: Stockbridge (Stockbridge, Georgia)
- College: Ole Miss
- NFL draft: 2019: 7th round, 252nd overall pick

Career history
- New England Patriots (2019)*; Miami Dolphins (2019–2020); San Francisco 49ers (2020); New York Jets (2021)*; Saskatchewan Roughriders (2023)*
- * Offseason or practice squad member only

Career NFL statistics
- Total tackles: 25
- Pass deflections: 1
- Forced fumbles: 1
- Stats at Pro Football Reference

Kendarius DeMaureya Webster (born June 19, 1996) is an American former professional football player who was a cornerback in the National Football League (NFL). He played college football for the Ole Miss Rebels.

== Professional career ==
Pre-draft measurables
Height	Weight	Arm length	Hand span	40-yard dash	20-yard shuttle	Three-cone drill	Vertical jump	Broad jump	Bench press
5 ft 10 7/8 in (1.80 m)	203 lb (92 kg)	32 in (0.81 m)	8 7/8 in (0.23 m)	4.43 s	4.14 s	6.85 s	43.0 in (1.09 m)	11 ft 1 in (3.38 m)	18 reps
All values from NFL Combine

=== New England Patriots ===
Webster was selected by the New England Patriots in the seventh round (252nd overall) of the 2019 NFL draft. He was released by the Patriots during final roster cuts on August 31, 2019.

=== Miami Dolphins ===
On September 1, 2019, Webster was claimed off waivers by the Miami Dolphins. He was placed on injured reserve on December 10, 2019. He finished the season with 19 tackles and a pass deflection in eight games and five starts. On September 5, 2020, Webster was waived by the Dolphins and signed to the practice squad the next day.

=== San Francisco 49ers ===
On September 16, 2020, Webster was signed to the active roster of the San Francisco 49ers off the Dolphins practice squad. He was placed on injured reserve on December 1, 2020. On January 21, 2021, Webster signed a one-year contract extension with the team. He was waived on August 16, 2021.

=== New York Jets ===
On December 22, 2021, Webster was signed to the New York Jets practice squad.

=== Saskatchewan Roughriders ===
On January 31, 2023, the Saskatchewan Roughriders of the Canadian Football League signed Webster. On June 4, 2023, Webster was released by the Roughriders.
