= Ji'Ayir Brown =

American football player (born 2000)

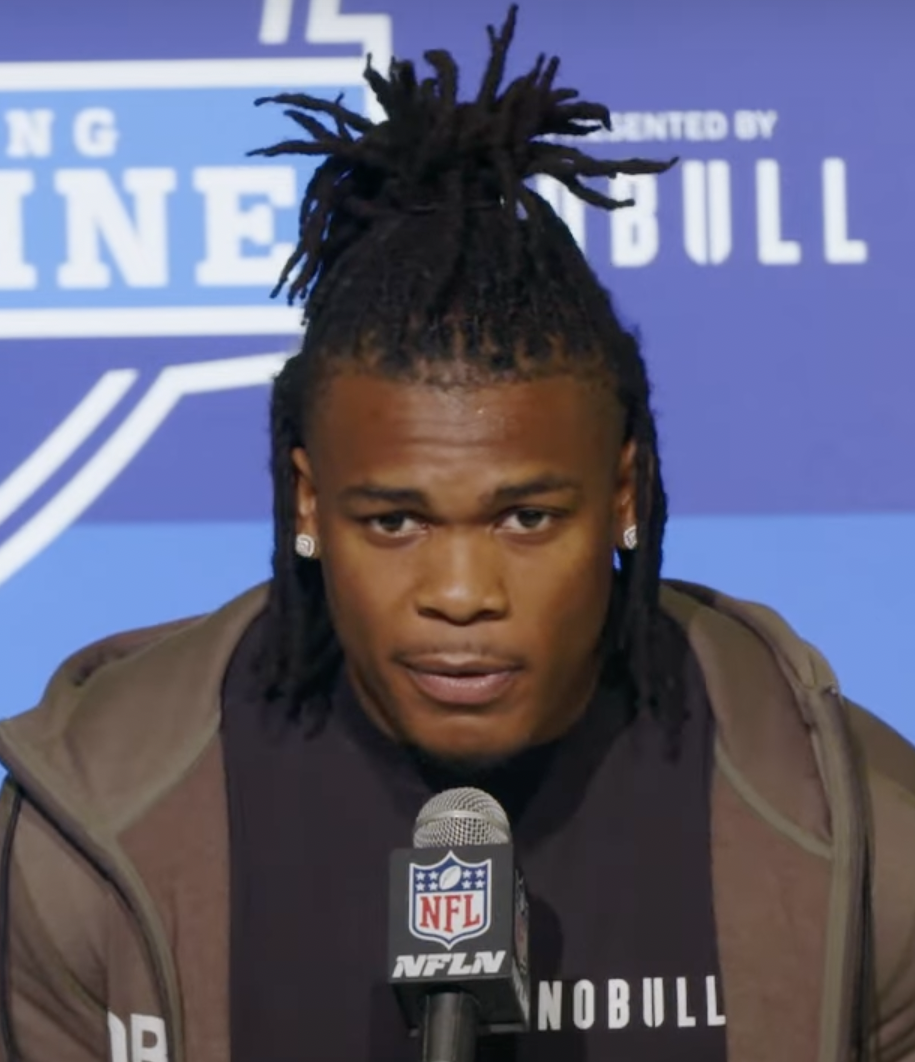
- Brown at the 2023 NFL Combine

No. 27 – San Francisco 49ers
- Position: Safety
- Roster status: Active

Personal information
- Born: January 25, 2000 (age 26); Trenton, New Jersey, U.S.
- Listed height: 5 ft 11 in (1.80 m)
- Listed weight: 202 lb (92 kg)

Career information
- High school: Trenton Central (NJ)
- College: Lackawanna (2018–2019); Penn State (2020–2022)
- NFL draft: 2023: 3rd round, 87th overall pick

Career history
- San Francisco 49ers (2023–present)

Awards and highlights
- PFWA All-Rookie Team (2023); 2× Third-team All-Big Ten (2021, 2022)

Career NFL statistics as of Week 10, 2026
- Total tackles: 239
- Forced fumbles: 1
- Pass deflections: 19
- Interceptions: 5
- Stats at Pro Football Reference

Ji'Ayir A'Veon Brown (born January 25, 2000) is an American professional football safety for the San Francisco 49ers of the National Football League (NFL). He played college football for the Lackawanna Falcons and Penn State Nittany Lions. Brown was selected by the 49ers in the third round of the 2023 NFL draft.

== Early life ==
Brown was born on January 25, 2000, in Trenton, New Jersey, where he attended and played high school football for Trenton Central High School.

== College career ==
Brown attended Lackawanna College in 2018 and 2019. In 2019, he was the Northeast JC Football Conference Defensive Player of the Year.

In 2020, Brown transferred to Penn State University. After spending his first year as a backup, Brown took over as a starter in 2021. In 13 starts, he had 73 tackles, six interceptions, and a touchdown. Brown returned to Penn State in 2022. He was named the defensive MVP of the 2023 Rose Bowl.

== Professional career ==
Pre-draft measurables
Height	Weight	Arm length	Hand span	Wingspan	40-yard dash	10-yard split	20-yard split	20-yard shuttle	Vertical jump	Broad jump	Bench press
5 ft 11 3/8 in (1.81 m)	203 lb (92 kg)	31 1/4 in (0.79 m)	10 1/8 in (0.26 m)	6 ft 3 3/4 in (1.92 m)	4.58 s	1.59 s	2.63 s	4.21 s	35.5 in (0.90 m)	10 ft 4 in (3.15 m)	18 reps
All values from NFL Combine/Pro Day

=== 2023 ===
The San Francisco 49ers selected Brown in the third round (87th overall) of the 2023 NFL draft. The 49ers orchestrated a trade with the Minnesota Vikings in order to secure their ability to draft him by trading their third (102nd overall), fifth (164th overall), and seventh round (222nd overall) picks to the Vikings in return for their third-round (87th overall) pick in the 2023 NFL Draft. Brown was the fourth safety selected in 2023.

On May 13, 2023, the 49ers signed Brown to a four-year, $5.39 million rookie contract that included a signing bonus of $924,224. Throughout training camp, Brown competed for the role as the starting free safety against veteran Tashaun Gipson under defensive coordinator Steve Wilks. Head coach Kyle Shanahan named Brown the No. 2 free safety on the depth chart behind Gipson and Talanoa Hufanga.

Brown made his professional regular season debut in the season-opening 30–7 road victory over the Pittsburgh Steelers, but was limited to nine snaps on special teams. During Week 11 against the Tampa Bay Buccaneers, Hufanga suffered a knee injury in the third quarter and Brown had to replace him. Brown finished the 27–14 victory with four combined tackles (two solo), a season-high three pass deflections, and his first career interception on a pass attempt thrown by Baker Mayfield to wide receiver Chris Godwin to seal the victory for the 49ers.

On November 21, 2023, Brown was officially named the starting strong safety for the remainder of the season after Hufanga was placed on injured reserve with a torn ACL. During Week 12 against the Seattle Seahawks on Thanksgiving, Brown earned his first career start and recorded four combined tackles (one solo) in the 31–13 road victory. In the next game against the Philadelphia Eagles, Brown had a season-high six combined tackles (five solo) during the 42–19 road victory. The following week against the Seahawks, he tied his season-high of six combined tackles (five solo) while also deflecting a pass and intercepting a pass by Drew Lock to wide receiver D. K. Metcalf in the 28–16 victory.

During Week 15 against the Arizona Cardinals, Brown once again tied his season-high of six combined tackles (five solo) in the 45–29 road victory. In the next game against the Baltimore Ravens on Christmas Day, Brown had five combined tackles (three solo) before leaving the eventual 33–19 loss during the third quarter with a knee injury. He subsequently remained inactive for the last two games (Weeks 17–18) of the regular season due to his injury.

Brown finished his rookie year with 35 combined tackles (22 solo), four pass deflections, and two interceptions in 15 games and five starts. He was named to the PFWA All-Rookie Team and received an overall grade of 73.4 from Pro Football Focus. The 49ers finished atop the NFC West with a 12–5 record and qualified for the playoffs as the #1-seed. During the NFC Championship Game against the Detroit Lions, Brown had 10 combined tackles (five solo) in the 34–31 comeback victory as the 49ers advanced to Super Bowl LVIII. In the Super Bowl against the Kansas City Chiefs, he recorded 11 combined tackles (seven solo), a pass deflection, and an interception off of Patrick Mahomes during the 25–22 overtime loss.

=== 2024 ===
Brown entered the 2024 season as the 49ers' presumptive starting safety, but was benched in favor of rookie Malik Mustapha near the end of the season after struggling in multiple games.

Brown finished his second professional season with 77 combined tackles (48 solo), six pass deflections, and an interception in 17 games and 13 starts.

=== 2025 ===
During a Week 10 42–26 loss to the Los Angeles Rams, Brown had a season-high 10 combined tackles (three solo) and a pass deflection. Two weeks later against the Carolina Panthers on Monday Night Football, he recorded five tackles, a season-high two pass deflections, and intercepted Bryce Young twice in the 20–9 victory. Brown was named NFC Defensive Player of the Week for his performance against the Panthers.

During Week 16 against the Indianapolis Colts on Monday Night Football, Brown recorded a team-high nine combined tackles (tied with Tatum Bethune) and a forced fumble in the 48–27 road victory. In the next game against the Chicago Bears on Sunday Night Football, he had four combined tackles (one solo) and a pass deflection during the 42–38 victory. During the regular season finale against the Seattle Seahawks, Brown recorded a team-high eight combined tackles (tied with Renardo Green) in the 13–3 loss.

Brown finished the 2025 season with 76 combined tackles (44 solo), six pass deflections, two interceptions, and a forced fumble in 17 games and 13 starts. The 49ers finished third in the NFC West with a 12–5 record and qualified for the playoffs as the #6-seed. During the Wild Card Round against the Eagles, Brown had four combined tackles (two solo) before leaving the eventual 23–19 road victory with a hamstring injury. He subsequently missed the Divisional Round against the Seahawks due to his injury.

=== 2026 ===
During Week 2 against the Miami Dolphins, Brown recorded a team-high 13 combined tackles (four solo) in the 35–13 victory. In the next game against the Cardinals, he had six combined tackles (two solo) and a pass deflection during the 36–30 victory. Two weeks later against the Seahawks, Brown had seven combined tackles (six solo) and a pass deflection in the 32–29 road victory.

== NFL career statistics ==
Legend
**Bold**	Career high

=== Regular season ===
Year	Team	Games		Tackles					Interceptions						Fumbles			
Year	Team	GP	GS	Cmb	Solo	Ast	TFL	Sck	PD	Int	Yds	Avg	Lng	TD	FF	FR	Yds	TD
2023	SF	15	5	35	22	13	0	0.0	4	**2**	0	0.0	0	0	0	0	0	0
2024	SF	**17**	**13**	**77**	**48**	29	**3**	0.0	**6**	1	0	0.0	0	0	0	0	0	0
2025	SF	**17**	**13**	76	44	**32**	2	0.0	**6**	**2**	**4**	**2.0**	**4**	0	**1**	0	0	0
2026	SF	9	9	51	28	23	1	0.0	3	0	0	0.0	0	0	0	0	0	0
Career		58	40	239	142	97	6	0.0	19	5	4	0.8	4	0	1	0	0	0

=== Postseason ===
Year	Team	Games		Tackles					Interceptions						Fumbles			
Year	Team	GP	GS	Cmb	Solo	Ast	TFL	Sck	PD	Int	Yds	Avg	Lng	TD	FF	FR	Yds	TD
2023	SF	**2**	**2**	**21**	**12**	**9**	0	0.0	**1**	**1**	0	0.0	0	0	0	0	0	0
2025	SF	1	1	4	2	2	0	0.0	0	0	0	0.0	0	0	0	0	0	0
Career		3	3	25	14	11	0	0.0	1	1	0	0.0	0	0	0	0	0	0
