= 2024 San Francisco 49ers season =

American football team season

- Owner: Jed York
- General manager: John Lynch
- Head coach: Kyle Shanahan
- Offensive coordinator: Kyle Shanahan (de facto)
- Defensive coordinator: Nick Sorensen
- Home stadium: Levi's Stadium

Results
- Record: 6–11
- Division place: 4th NFC West
- Playoffs: Did not qualify
- All-Pros: ILB Fred Warner (1st team); FB Kyle Juszczyk (2nd team); TE George Kittle (2nd team)
- Pro Bowlers: FB Kyle Juszczyk; TE George Kittle; DE Nick Bosa; ILB Fred Warner

Uniform
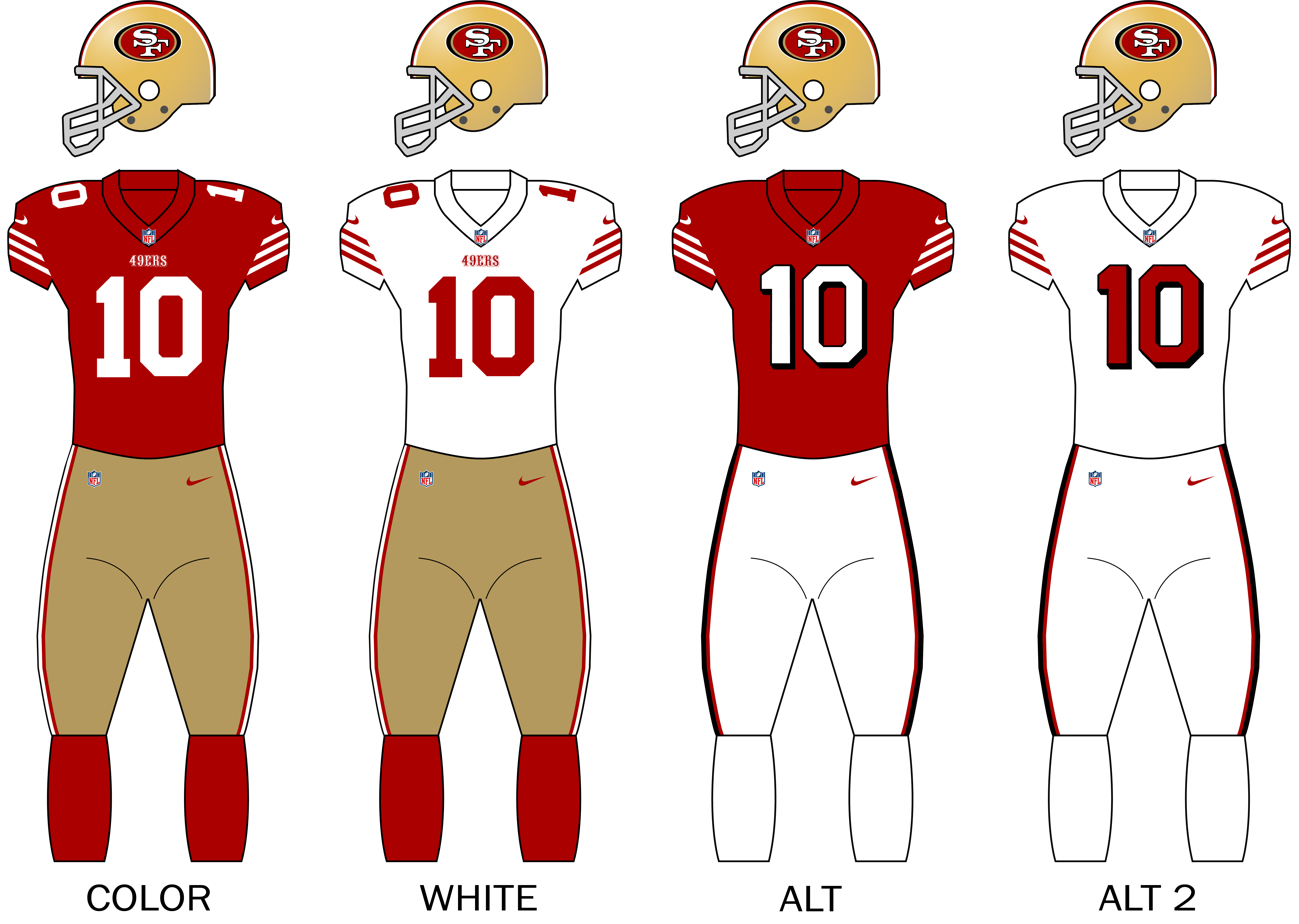

The 2024 season was the San Francisco 49ers' 75th in the National Football League (NFL), their 79th overall, their eleventh playing their home games at Levi's Stadium and their eighth under the head coach/general manager tandem of Kyle Shanahan and John Lynch. It was also the first with CEO Jed York as principal owner; after serving as operating head of the franchise since 2008, he acquired enough equity from his mother, co-chairwoman Denise DeBartolo York, to become principal owner. DeBartolo York and her husband, John York, remained co-chairs.

The 49ers entered the season as defending NFC Champions. However, the team went on to lose seven of their final eight games, failing to improve on their 12–5 record from 2023. A Week 11 home loss to their division rival Seattle Seahawks, 20–17, followed by back-to-back road blowout losses (a Week 12 loss to their rival Green Bay Packers, 38–10 and a 35–10 loss to the Buffalo Bills on a snowy Sunday night in Week 13), highlighted their midseason decline. With wins by the Los Angeles Rams and Washington Commanders in Week 16, the 49ers were officially eliminated from playoff contention for the first time since 2020. Later that day, a loss to the Miami Dolphins confirmed the franchise’s first losing season since that year. Overall, their 6–11 record was the worst for a team coming off a Super Bowl loss since the 2003 Oakland Raiders went 4–12.

The team was heavily impacted by injuries to key starters throughout the season. Christian McCaffrey, Brandon Aiyuk, Jordan Mason, Trent Williams, and Mitch Wishnowsky, among others, were placed on injured reserve and missed the remainder of the season. McCaffrey had suffered an Achilles injury that caused him to miss the first eight games. Due in large part to these injuries, several members of the 2024 rookie draft class saw significant playing time, including wide receiver Ricky Pearsall, offensive guard Dominick Puni, and defensive backs Renardo Green and Malik Mustapha. The 49ers' defense struggled under defensive coordinator Nick Sorensen, finishing 29th in points allowed and recording only two takeaways following their bye week. Sorensen was subsequently relieved of his duties following the season. Special teams coordinator Brian Schneider was also dismissed after the season due to continued struggles in the kicking game.

== Offseason ==
=== Roster changes ===
==== Free agency ====
The 49ers entered free agency with the following:

Position	Player	Free agency tag	Date signed	2024 team	Notes
DE	Randy Gregory	UFA	April 3, 2024	Tampa Bay Buccaneers	Signed one-year contract
DE	Chase Young	UFA	March 18, 2024	New Orleans Saints	Signed one-year contract
QB	Sam Darnold	UFA	March 13, 2024	Minnesota Vikings	Signed one-year contract
DT	Javon Kinlaw	UFA	March 14, 2024	New York Jets	Signed one-year contract
FS	Tashaun Gipson	UFA	August 11, 2024	Jacksonville Jaguars	
DT	Sebastian Joseph-Day	UFA	March 20, 2024	Tennessee Titans	Signed one-year contract
OLB	Oren Burks	UFA	March 19, 2024	Philadelphia Eagles	Signed one-year contract
DE	Clelin Ferrell	UFA	March 18, 2024	Washington Commanders	Signed one-year contract
C	Jon Feliciano	UFA	March 18, 2024	San Francisco 49ers	Signed one-year contract
DT	Kevin Givens	UFA	March 14, 2024	San Francisco 49ers	Signed one-year contract
WR	Ray-Ray McCloud	UFA	March 18, 2024	Atlanta Falcons	Signed two-year contract
OLB	Demetrius Flannigan-Fowles	UFA	March 15, 2024	San Francisco 49ers	Signed one-year contract
TE	Ross Dwelley	UFA	May 13, 2024	Atlanta Falcons	Signed one-year contract
QB	Brandon Allen	UFA	March 13, 2024	San Francisco 49ers	Signed one-year contract
WR	Chris Conley	UFA	March 16, 2024	San Francisco 49ers	Signed one-year contract
SS	Logan Ryan	UFA			
OT	Matt Pryor	UFA	March 13, 2024	Chicago Bears	Signed one-year contract
WR	Jauan Jennings	RFA	May 29, 2024	San Francisco 49ers	Signed two-year contract
G	Ben Bartch	RFA		San Francisco 49ers	
TE	Charlie Woerner	UFA	March 13, 2024	Atlanta Falcons	Signed three-year contract
CB	Terrance Mitchell	UFA			
RFA: Restricted free agent, UFA: Unrestricted free agent, ERFA: Exclusive rights free agent LEGEND – Light green background indicates a player has been re-signed by the 49ers. – Light red background indicates a player has departed the 49ers.

==== Signings ====
Position	Player	2023 team	Date signed	Notes
DT	Jordan Elliott	Cleveland Browns	March 14, 2024	Signed two-year contract
DE	Yetur Gross-Matos	Carolina Panthers	March 14, 2024	Signed two-year contract
DE	Leonard Floyd	Buffalo Bills	March 18, 2024	Signed two-year contract
LB	De'Vondre Campbell	Green Bay Packers	March 18, 2024	Signed one-year contract
CB	Chase Lucas	Detroit Lions	March 18, 2024	Signed one-year contract
OT	Brandon Parker	Las Vegas Raiders	March 18, 2024	Signed one-year contract
CB	Isaac Yiadom	New Orleans Saints	March 18, 2024	Signed one-year contract
QB	Joshua Dobbs	Arizona Cardinals/Minnesota Vikings	March 19, 2024	Signed one-year contract
LB	Ezekiel Turner	Arizona Cardinals	March 20, 2024	Signed one-year contract
TE	Eric Saubert	Houston Texans	April 8, 2024	Signed one-year contract
RB	Patrick Taylor	Green Bay Packers	April 8, 2024	Signed one-year contract
CB	Rock Ya-Sin	Baltimore Ravens	April 11, 2024	Signed one-year contract
WR	Trent Taylor	Chicago Bears	April 16, 2024	Signed one-year contract
DT	Shakel Brown	Tennessee Titans	May 14, 2024	Signed one-year contract
OT	Chris Hubbard	Tennessee Titans	May 14, 2024	Signed one-year contract
TE	Logan Thomas	Washington Commanders	June 4, 2024	Signed one-year contract
WR	Malik Turner		July 25, 2024	Signed one-year contract
WR	Frank Darby	Atlanta Falcons	July 27, 2024	Signed one-year contract
C	Pat Elflein	Arizona Cardinals	August 2, 2024	Signed one-year contract
OT	Lewis Kidd		August 5, 2024	Signed one-year contract
RB	Matt Breida	New York Giants	August 6, 2024	Signed one-year contract
WR	Jontre Kirklin		August 7, 2024	Signed one-year contract
RB	Ke'Shawn Vaughn		August 7, 2024	Signed one-year contract
S	Tracy Walker III	Detroit Lions	August 8, 2024	Signed one-year contract
DE	Jonathan Garvin		August 9, 2024	Signed one-year contract
P	Pressley Harvin III		August 9, 2024	Signed one-year contract
WR	Robbie Chosen	Miami Dolphins	August 12, 2024	Signed one-year contract
DE	Nick Williams	Los Angeles Chargers	August 14, 2024	Signed one-year contract
K	Matthew Wright		October 8, 2024	Signed one-year contract

Indicates that the player was a free agent at the end of his respective team's 2023 season.

==== Departures ====
Position	Player	Date	Notes
CB	Isaiah Oliver	February 23, 2024	Released
DT	Arik Armstead	March 13, 2024	Released
DE	Spencer Waege	May 8, 2024	Waived
DE	Earnest Brown IV	May 14, 2024	Waived
C	Corey Luciano	May 14, 2024	Waived
DE	Raymond Johnson	June 4, 2024	Waived
CB	Kemon Hall	July 27, 2024	Waived
OT	Briason Mays	August 2, 2024	Waived
S	Erik Harris	August 7, 2024	Released
TE	Logan Thomas	August 9, 2024	Released
LB	Ezekiel Turner	August 14, 2024	Released
RB	Matt Breida	August 26, 2024	Released
RB	Ke'Shawn Vaughn	August 26, 2024	Released
P	Pressley Harvin III	August 26, 2024	Waived
OT	Lewis Kidd	August 26, 2024	Waived
WR	Jontre Kirklin	August 26, 2024	Waived
C	Ben Bartch	August 27, 2024	Released
WR	Robbie Chosen	August 27, 2024	Released
OT	Chris Hubbard	August 27, 2024	Released
DT	T. Y. McGill	August 27, 2024	Released
OT	Brandon Parker	August 27, 2024	Released
TE	Eric Saubert	August 27, 2024	Released
WR	Trent Taylor	August 27, 2024	Released
TE	Logan Thomas	August 27, 2024	Released
S	Tracy Walker III	August 27, 2024	Released
DE	Nick Williams	August 27, 2024	Released
CB	Rock Ya-Sin	August 27, 2024	Released
OT	Isaac Alarcón	August 27, 2024	Waived
DT	Evan Anderson	August 27, 2024	Waived
DE	Alex Barrett	August 27, 2024	Waived
DT	Shakel Brown	August 27, 2024	Waived
DE	Jonathan Garvin	August 27, 2024	Waived
LB	Jalen Graham	August 27, 2024	Waived
WR	Danny Gray	August 27, 2024	Waived
OT	Sebastian Gutierrez	August 27, 2024	Waived
G	Jarrett Kingston	August 27, 2024	Waived
TE	Cameron Latu	August 27, 2024	Waived
CB	Chase Lucas	August 27, 2024	Waived
S	Jaylen Mahoney	August 27, 2024	Waived
WR	Tay Martin	August 27, 2024	Waived
QB	Tanner Mordecai	August 27, 2024	Waived
C	Drake Nugent	August 27, 2024	Waived
TE	Mason Pline	August 27, 2024	Waived
RB	Cody Schrader	August 27, 2024	Waived
TE	Brayden Willis	August 27, 2024	Waived
CB	Samuel Womack	August 27, 2024	Waived

== Draft ==
2024 San Francisco 49ers draft selections
Round	Selection	Player	Position	College	Notes
1	31	Ricky Pearsall	WR	Florida	
2	63	Traded to the Kansas City Chiefs (Note: The 49ers traded second- and sixth-round selections (63rd and 211th overall) to the Kansas City Chiefs in exchange for second- and fifth-round selections (64th and 173rd overall).)			
2	64	Renardo Green	CB	Florida State	From Chiefs
3	86	Dominick Puni	OT	Kansas	From Eagles (Note: The 49ers traded third- and fourth-round selections (94th and 132nd overall) to the Philadelphia Eagles in exchange for a third-round selection (86th overall).)
3	94	Traded to the Philadelphia Eagles			
3	100	Traded to the Washington Commanders (Note: The 49ers traded a third-round selection (100th overall) to the Washington Commanders in exchange for DE Chase Young.)			Compensatory pick
4	124	Malik Mustapha	S	Wake Forest	From Cowboys (Note: The 49ers traded QB Trey Lance to the Dallas Cowboys in exchange for a fourth-round selection (124th overall).)
4	129	Isaac Guerendo	RB	Louisville	From Jets (Note: The 49ers traded two fifth-round selections (173rd and 176th overall) to the New York Jets in exchange for a fourth-round selection (129th overall).)
4	132	Traded to the Philadelphia Eagles			Compensatory pick
4	135	Jacob Cowing	WR	Arizona	Selection moved (Note: The 49ers forfeited their 2025 fifth-round selection and had their fourth-round selection (131st overall) moved to the end of the round (135th overall) as punishment for administrative payroll accounting errors.)
5	166	Traded to the Carolina Panthers (Note: The 49ers traded a fifth-round selection (166th overall) and 2023 second-, third-, and fourth-round selections to the Carolina Panthers in exchange for RB Christian McCaffrey.)			
5	173	Traded to the New York Jets			From Chiefs
5	176	Traded to the New York Jets			Compensatory pick
6	207	Traded to the Denver Broncos (Note: The 49ers traded a sixth-round selection (207th overall) to the Denver Broncos in exchange for a seventh-round selection and LB Randy Gregory.)			
6	211	Traded to the Kansas City Chiefs			Compensatory pick
6	215	Jarrett Kingston	OG	USC	Compensatory pick
7	232	Traded to the Houston Texans (Note: The 49ers traded a seventh-round selection (232nd overall) to the Houston Texans in exchange for DT Maliek Collins.)			From Broncos
7	251	Tatum Bethune	LB	Florida State	

2024 San Francisco 49ers undrafted free agents
Name	Position	College	Ref.
Evan Anderson	DT	Florida Atlantic	
Jaylen Mahoney	S	Vanderbilt	
Briason Mays	OT	Southern Miss	
Tanner Mordecai	QB	Wisconsin	
Drake Nugent	C	Michigan	
Terique Owens	WR	Missouri State	
Mason Pline	TE	Furman	
Cody Schrader	RB	Missouri	

Draft trades

== Staff ==
2024 San Francisco 49ers staff
Front office: Co-chairmen – John and Denise DeBartolo York; Chief executive officer – Jed York; President – Al Guido; President of football operations/general manager – John Lynch; Executive vice president of football operations – Paraag Marathe; Vice president and senior advisor – Keena Turner; Director of player personnel – Tariq Ahmad and R. J. Gillen; Director, scouting and football operations – Josh Williams; Director of college scouting – Dominic DeCicco; Director of pro scouting – Fred Gammage III; Associate director of college scouting – Justin Chabot; Director, R&D – Matt Ploenzke, PhD; Senior personnel advisor – Frank Gore; Vice president of football administration – Brian Hampton; Head coaches: Head coach – Kyle Shanahan; Assistant head coach/defense – Brandon Staley; Offensive coaches: Offensive passing game specialist – Klay Kubiak; Quarterbacks – Brian Griese; Running backs – Bobby Turner; Wide receivers – Leonard Hankerson; Tight ends – Brian Fleury; Run game coordinator/offensive line – Chris Foerster; Assistant offensive line – Cameron Clemmons; Assistant offensive line – Joe Graves; Senior offensive assistant – Mick Lombardi; Offensive assistant – Miguel Reveles; Offensive quality control – Asauni Rufus; Offensive quality control – Deuce Schwartz	Defensive coaches: Defensive coordinator – Nick Sorensen; Defensive line – Kris Kocurek; Linebackers – Johnny Holland; Passing game specialist/defensive backs – Daniel Bullocks; Assistant defensive backs – Andrew Hayes-Stoker; Defensive quality control – Cameron Brown; Defensive quality control – Jacob Webster; Defensive quality control – K. J. Wright; Special teams coaches: Special teams coordinator – Brian Schneider; Assistant special teams – Matthew Harper; Special teams quality control/game management specialist – August Mangin; Strength and conditioning: Head strength and conditioning – Dustin Perry; Assistant strength and conditioning – Greg Segrove; Assistant strength and conditioning – Jordan Nieuwsma

== Final roster ==
2024 San Francisco 49ers roster
Quarterbacks (QB): 17 Brandon Allen; 5 Joshua Dobbs; 13 Brock Purdy; Running backs (RB): 20 Israel Abanikanda; 31 Isaac Guerendo; 32 Patrick Taylor; 44 Kyle Juszczyk FB; Wide receivers (WR): 18 Chris Conley; 19 Jacob Cowing; 15 Jauan Jennings; 14 Ricky Pearsall; 1 Deebo Samuel; Tight ends (TE): 85 George Kittle; 82 Eric Saubert; 88 Jake Tonges; 9 Brayden Willis	Offensive linemen (OL): 64 Jake Brendel C; 75 Charlie Heck RT; 61 Matt Hennessy C; 68 Colton McKivitz RT; 62 Austen Pleasants G; 77 Dominick Puni RG; 63 Nick Zakelj LG; Defensive linemen (DL): 69 Evan Anderson DT; 58 Alex Barrett DE; 51 Robert Beal Jr. DE; 97 Nick Bosa DE; 99 Maliek Collins DT; 93 Kalia Davis DT; 50 Khalil Davis DT; 92 Jordan Elliott DT; 56 Leonard Floyd DE; 94 Yetur Gross-Matos DE; 91 Sam Okuayinonu DE	Linebackers (LB): 48 Tatum Bethune MLB; 41 Jalen Graham MLB; 54 Fred Warner MLB; 47 DaShaun White MLB; 53 Dee Winters OLB; Defensive backs (DB): 30 Tre Avery CB; 27 Ji'Ayir Brown FS; 43 Tashaun Gipson SS; 0 Renardo Green CB; 29 Talanoa Hufanga SS; 2 Deommodore Lenoir CB; 35 Nick McCloud CB; 6 Malik Mustapha FS; 7 Charvarius Ward CB; 33 Rock Ya-Sin CB; 22 Isaac Yiadom CB; Special teams (ST): 4 Jake Moody K; 40 Pat O'Donnell P; 46 Taybor Pepper LS	Practice squad: 67 Isaac Alarcón RT (IPP); 10 Ronnie Bell WR; 84 Russell Gage WR; 96 Jonathan Garvin DE; 60 Sebastian Gutierrez LT; -- Tarron Jackson DE; 69 Zack Johnson G; 26 Chase Lucas CB; 38 Jaylen Mahoney FS; 4 Tanner Mordecai QB; 66 Drake Nugent C; 83 Terique Owens WR; 89 Mason Pline TE (PS/I); 75 Nesta Jade Silvera DT; 81 Trent Taylor WR; 40 Ke'Shawn Vaughn RB; Reserve: 11 Brandon Aiyuk WR (IR); 65 Aaron Banks LG (IR); 78 Ben Bartch C (IR); 74 Spencer Burford RG (IR); 59 De'Vondre Campbell OLB (Susp.); 55 Jon Feliciano C (IR); 45 Demetrius Flannigan-Fowles MLB (IR); 90 Kevin Givens DT (IR); 57 Dre Greenlaw OLB (IR); 98 Javon Hargrave DT (IR); 95 Drake Jackson DE (PUP); 28 Darrell Luter Jr. CB (IR); 24 Jordan Mason RB (IR); 23 Christian McCaffrey RB (IR); 25 Elijah Mitchell RB (IR); 76 Jaylon Moore LT (IR); 30 George Odum SS (IR); 36 Curtis Robinson OLB (IR); 71 Trent Williams LT (IR); 3 Mitch Wishnowsky P (IR); Rookies in italics 53 active, 20 reserve, 14 practice squad (2 exempt)

== Preseason ==
Week	Date	Opponent	Result	Record	Venue	Recap
1	August 10	at Tennessee Titans	L 13–17	0–1	Nissan Stadium	Recap
2	August 18	New Orleans Saints	W 16–10	1–1	Levi's Stadium	Recap
3	August 23	at Las Vegas Raiders	T 24–24	1–1–1	Allegiant Stadium	Recap

== Regular season ==
=== Schedule ===
Week	Date	Opponent	Result	Record	Venue	Recap
1	September 9	New York Jets	**W** 32–19	1–0	Levi's Stadium	Recap
2	September 15	at Minnesota Vikings	**L** 17–23	1–1	U.S. Bank Stadium	Recap
3	September 22	at **Los Angeles Rams**	**L** 24–27	1–2	SoFi Stadium	Recap
4	September 29	New England Patriots	**W** 30–13	2–2	Levi's Stadium	Recap
5	October 6	**Arizona Cardinals**	**L** 23–24	2–3	Levi's Stadium	Recap
6	October 10	at **Seattle Seahawks**	**W** 36–24	3–3	Lumen Field	Recap
7	October 20	Kansas City Chiefs	**L** 18–28	3–4	Levi's Stadium	Recap
8	October 27	Dallas Cowboys	**W** 30–24	4–4	Levi's Stadium	Recap
9	Bye					
10	November 10	at Tampa Bay Buccaneers	**W** 23–20	5–4	Raymond James Stadium	Recap
11	November 17	**Seattle Seahawks**	**L** 17–20	5–5	Levi's Stadium	Recap
12	November 24	at Green Bay Packers	**L** 10–38	5–6	Lambeau Field	Recap
13	December 1	at Buffalo Bills	**L** 10–35	5–7	Highmark Stadium	Recap
14	December 8	Chicago Bears	**W** 38–13	6–7	Levi's Stadium	Recap
15	December 12	**Los Angeles Rams**	**L** 6–12	6–8	Levi's Stadium	Recap
16	December 22	at Miami Dolphins	**L** 17–29	6–9	Hard Rock Stadium	Recap
17	December 30	Detroit Lions	**L** 34–40	6–10	Levi's Stadium	Recap
18	January 5	at **Arizona Cardinals**	**L** 24–47	6–11	State Farm Stadium	Recap
Note: Intra-division opponents are in **bold** text.

=== Game summaries ===
==== Week 1: vs. New York Jets ====
Week 1: New York Jets at San Francisco 49ers – Game summary

Quarter	1	2	3	4	Total
Jets	7	0	6	6	**19**
**49ers**	3	13	10	6	**32**

at Levi's Stadium, Santa Clara, California

- Date: September 9
- Game time: 5:15 p.m. PDT
- Game weather: Sunny, 76 °F (24 °C)
- Game attendance: 71,319
- Referee: Carl Cheffers
- TV announcers (ESPN/ABC): Joe Buck, Troy Aikman, Lisa Salters and Laura Rutledge
- Recap, Game Book

Game information

**First quarter**

- SF – Jake Moody 46-yard field goal, 10:58. 49ers 3–0. **Drive: 4 plays, 3 yards, 0:49.**
- NYJ – Breece Hall 3-yard run (Greg Zuerlein kick), 3:51. Jets 7–3. **Drive: 12 plays, 70 yards, 7:07.**

**Second quarter**

- SF – Jake Moody 51-yard field goal, 14:04. Jets 7–6. **Drive: 9 plays, 37 yards, 4:47.**
- SF – Deebo Samuel 2-yard run (Jake Moody kick), 6:54. 49ers 13–7. **Drive: 12 plays, 67 yards, 5:49.**
- SF – Jake Moody 31-yard field goal, 0:04. 49ers 16–7. **Drive: 12 plays, 75 yards, 5:14.**

**Third quarter**

- SF – Jordan Mason 5-yard run (Jake Moody kick), 7:24. 49ers 23–7. **Drive: 11 plays, 70 yards, 7:18.**
- SF – Jake Moody 53-yard field goal, 3:28. 49ers 26–7. **Drive: 8 plays, 26 yards, 2:43.**
- NYJ – Allen Lazard 36-yard pass from Aaron Rodgers (run failed), 1:39. 49ers 26–13. **Drive: 5 plays, 70 yards, 1:49.**

**Fourth quarter**

- SF – Jake Moody 23-yard field goal, 9:43. 49ers 29–13. **Drive: 11 plays, 75 yards, 6:56.**
- SF – Jake Moody 42-yard field goal, 4:20. 49ers 32–13. **Drive: 5 plays, 26 yards, 3:02.**
- NYJ – Allen Lazard 3-yard pass from Tyrod Taylor (pass failed), 0:25. 49ers 32–19. **Drive: 12 plays, 70 yards, 3:55.**

**Top passers**

- NYJ – Aaron Rodgers – 13/21, 167 yards, TD, INT
- SF – Brock Purdy – 19/29, 231 yards

**Top rushers**

- NYJ – Breece Hall – 16 rushes, 54 yards, TD
- SF – Jordan Mason – 28 rushes, 147 yards, TD

**Top receivers**

- NYJ – Allen Lazard – 6 receptions, 89 yards, 2 TD
- SF – Jauan Jennings – 5 receptions, 64 yards

==== Week 2: at Minnesota Vikings ====
Week 2: San Francisco 49ers at Minnesota Vikings – Game summary

Quarter	1	2	3	4	Total
49ers	0	7	0	10	**17**
**Vikings**	3	10	7	3	**23**

at U.S. Bank Stadium, Minneapolis, Minnesota

- Date: September 15
- Game time: 12:00 p.m. CDT/10:00 a.m. PDT
- Game weather: None (indoor stadium)
- Game attendance: 66,741
- Referee: Brad Allen
- TV announcers (CBS): Kevin Harlan, Trent Green and Melanie Collins
- Recap, Game Book

Game information

**First quarter**

- MIN – Will Reichard 22-yard field goal, 4:45. Vikings 3–0. **Drive: 5 plays, 20 yards, 2:10.**

**Second quarter**

- MIN – Justin Jefferson 97-yard pass from Sam Darnold (Will Reichard kick), 9:35. Vikings 10–0. **Drive: 2 plays, 98 yards, 0:52.**
- SF – George Kittle 7-yard pass from Brock Purdy (Jake Moody kick), 1:53. Vikings 10–7. **Drive: 5 plays, 65 yards, 2:45.**
- MIN – Will Reichard 39-yard field goal, 0:00. Vikings 13–7. **Drive: 8 plays, 49 yards, 1:53.**

**Third quarter**

- MIN – Jalen Nailor 10-yard pass from Sam Darnold (Will Reichard kick), 6:49. Vikings 20–7. **Drive: 1 play, 10 yards, 0:04.**

**Fourth quarter**

- SF – Jordan Mason 10-yard run (Jake Moody kick), 10:16. Vikings 20–14. **Drive: 12 plays, 99 yards, 4:52.**
- MIN – Will Reichard 27-yard field goal, 3:30. Vikings 23–14. **Drive: 14 plays, 62 yards, 6:46.**
- SF – Jake Moody 31-yard field goal, 1:12. Vikings 23–17. **Drive: 9 plays, 57 yards, 2:18.**

**Top passers**

- SF – Brock Purdy – 28/36, 319 yards, TD, INT
- MIN – Sam Darnold – 17/26, 268 yards, 2 TD, INT

**Top rushers**

- SF – Jordan Mason – 20 rushes, 100 yards, TD
- MIN – Ty Chandler – 10 rushes, 82 yards

**Top receivers**

- SF – Deebo Samuel – 8 receptions, 110 yards
- MIN – Justin Jefferson – 4 receptions, 133 yards, TD

This was the 49ers' 8th straight loss to the Vikings in Minneapolis, a streak that dates back to 1994.

==== Week 3: at Los Angeles Rams ====
Week 3: San Francisco 49ers at Los Angeles Rams – Game summary

Quarter	1	2	3	4	Total
49ers	14	0	7	3	**24**
**Rams**	0	7	7	13	**27**

at SoFi Stadium, Inglewood, California

- Date: September 22
- Game time: 1:25 p.m. PDT
- Game weather: Sunny, 75 °F (24 °C) (fixed roof)
- Game attendance: 74,484
- Referee: Clete Blakeman
- TV announcers (Fox): Adam Amin, Mark Sanchez and Kristina Pink
- Recap, Game Book

Game information

**First quarter**

- SF – Jauan Jennings 13-yard pass from Brock Purdy (Jake Moody kick), 11:12. 49ers 7–0. **Drive: 8 plays, 70 yards, 3:48.**
- SF – Jauan Jennings 4-yard pass from Brock Purdy (Jake Moody kick), 1:47. 49ers 14–0. **Drive: 13 plays, 77 yards, 7:53.**

**Second quarter**

- LAR – Kyren Williams 15-yard pass from Matthew Stafford (Joshua Karty kick), 1:11. 49ers 14–7. **Drive: 16 plays, 87 yards, 7:44.**

**Third quarter**

- SF – Jauan Jennings 31-yard pass from Brock Purdy (Jake Moody kick), 7:01. 49ers 21–7. **Drive: 11 plays, 91 yards, 6:27.**
- LAR – Kyren Williams 3-yard run (Joshua Karty kick), 3:53. 49ers 21–14. **Drive: 6 plays, 70 yards, 3:08.**

**Fourth quarter**

- SF – Jake Moody 26-yard field goal, 11:57. 49ers 24–14. **Drive: 13 plays, 62 yards, 6:56.**
- LAR – Joshua Karty 33-yard field goal, 6:15. 49ers 24–17. **Drive: 13 plays, 55 yards, 5:42.**
- LAR – Kyren Williams 4-yard run (Joshua Karty kick), 1:51. Tied 24–24. **Drive: 3 plays, 55 yards, 0:52.**
- LAR – Joshua Karty 37-yard field goal, 0:02. Rams 27–24. **Drive: 2 plays, 31 yards, 0:40.**

**Top passers**

- SF – Brock Purdy – 22/30, 292 yards, 3 TD
- LAR – Matthew Stafford – 16/26, 221 yards, TD

**Top rushers**

- SF – Jordan Mason – 19 rushes, 77 yards
- LAR – Kyren Williams – 24 rushes, 89 yards, 2 TD

**Top receivers**

- SF – Jauan Jennings – 11 receptions, 175 yards, 3 TD
- LAR – Tutu Atwell – 4 receptions, 93 yards

Despite leading by 10 points in the fourth quarter, the 49ers suffered a late-game collapse as the Rams scored 13 unanswered points to defeat the 49ers 27–24. This was the 49ers' first regular season loss to the Rams in SoFi Stadium and their first regular season away loss to the Rams since 2018.

==== Week 4: vs. New England Patriots ====
Week 4: New England Patriots at San Francisco 49ers – Game summary

Quarter	1	2	3	4	Total
Patriots	0	3	7	3	**13**
**49ers**	6	14	7	3	**30**

at Levi's Stadium, Santa Clara, California

- Date: September 29
- Game time: 1:05 p.m. PDT
- Game weather: Sunny, 71 °F (22 °C)
- Game attendance: 71,042
- Referee: Scott Novak
- TV announcers (Fox): Joe Davis, Greg Olsen and Pam Oliver
- Recap, Game Book

Game information

**First quarter**

- SF – Jake Moody 22-yard field goal, 2:26. 49ers 3–0. **Drive: 15 plays, 90 yards, 7:45.**
- SF – Jake Moody 26-yard field goal, 0:06. 49ers 6–0. **Drive: 5 plays, 22 yards, 2:09.**

**Second quarter**

- SF – Fred Warner 45-yard interception return (Jake Moody kick), 14:01. 49ers 13–0. **Drive: 3 plays, 5 yards, 1:05.**
- SF – George Kittle 12-yard pass from Brock Purdy (Jake Moody kick), 3:11. 49ers 20–0. **Drive: 10 plays, 80 yards, 4:56.**
- NE – Joey Slye 63-yard field goal, 0:00. 49ers 20–3. **Drive: 4 plays, −6 yards, 0:38.**

**Third quarter**

- NE – Austin Hooper 5-yard pass from Jacoby Brissett (Joey Slye kick), 12:05. 49ers 20–10. **Drive: 5 plays, 27 yards, 2:49.**
- SF – Jordan Mason 4-yard run (Jake Moody kick), 10:08. 49ers 27–10. **Drive: 4 plays, 70 yards, 1:57.**

**Fourth quarter**

- NE – Joey Slye 54-yard field goal, 13:26. 49ers 27–13. **Drive: 8 plays, 32 yards, 2:07.**
- SF – Jake Moody 41-yard field goal, 4:58. 49ers 30–13. **Drive: 6 plays, 13 yards, 3:20.**

**Top passers**

- NE – Jacoby Brissett – 19/32, 168 yards, TD, INT
- SF – Brock Purdy – 15/27, 288 yards, TD, INT

**Top rushers**

- NE – Rhamondre Stevenson – 13 rushes, 43 yards
- SF – Jordan Mason – 24 rushes, 123 yards, TD

**Top receivers**

- NE – Antonio Gibson – 3 receptions, 67 yards
- SF – Jauan Jennings – 3 receptions, 88 yards

==== Week 5: vs. Arizona Cardinals ====
Week 5: Arizona Cardinals at San Francisco 49ers – Game summary

Quarter	1	2	3	4	Total
**Cardinals**	7	3	3	11	**24**
49ers	10	13	0	0	**23**

at Levi's Stadium, Santa Clara, California

- Date: October 6
- Game time: 1:05 p.m. PDT
- Game weather: Sunny, 89 °F (32 °C)
- Game attendance: 71,310
- Referee: Land Clark
- TV announcers (Fox): Kevin Burkhardt, Tom Brady, Erin Andrews and Tom Rinaldi
- Recap, Game Book

Game information

**First quarter**

- ARI – Kyler Murray 50-yard run (Chad Ryland kick), 13:12. Cardinals 7–0. **Drive: 2 plays, 72 yards, 0:47.**
- SF – Jake Moody 28-yard field goal, 10:25. Cardinals 7–3. **Drive: 6 plays, 60 yards, 2:47.**
- SF – George Kittle 4-yard pass from Brock Purdy (Jake Moody kick), 2:20. 49ers 10–7. **Drive: 13 plays, 76 yards, 7:11.**

**Second quarter**

- ARI – Chad Ryland 30-yard field goal, 12:43. Tied 10–10. **Drive: 10 plays, 58 yards, 4:37.**
- SF – Jake Moody 20-yard field goal, 6:59. 49ers 13–10. **Drive: 11 plays, 68 yards, 5:44.**
- SF – Deommodore Lenoir 61-yard return of blocked field goal (Jake Moody kick), 4:59. 49ers 20–10.
- SF – Mitch Wishnowsky 26-yard field goal, 0:00. 49ers 23–10. **Drive: 8 plays, 33 yards, 1:50.**

**Third quarter**

- ARI – Chad Ryland 42-yard field goal, 9:59. 49ers 23–13. **Drive: 4 plays, 1 yard, 1:53.**

**Fourth quarter**

- ARI – Elijah Higgins 2-yard pass from Kyler Murray (James Conner run), 11:25. 49ers 23–21. **Drive: 12 plays, 73 yards, 6:27.**
- ARI – Chad Ryland 35-yard field goal, 1:37. Cardinals 24–23. **Drive: 14 plays, 74 yards, 4:34.**

**Top passers**

- ARI – Kyler Murray – 19/30, 195 yards, TD, INT
- SF – Brock Purdy – 19/35, 244 yards, TD, 2 INT

**Top rushers**

- ARI – James Conner – 19 rushes, 86 yards
- SF – Jordan Mason – 14 rushes, 89 yards

**Top receivers**

- ARI – Michael Wilson – 5 receptions, 78 yards
- SF – Brandon Aiyuk – 8 receptions, 147 yards

The 49ers suffered another late collapse after leading 23–10 at halftime, as the Cardinals rallied to score 14 unanswered points in the second half. In the fourth quarter, running back Jordan Mason lost a fumble deep in Arizona territory when the 49ers could have taken a two-score lead; the Cardinals then marched down the field and added a field goal to take a 24–23 lead. On the ensuing possession, Brock Purdy was hit as he threw and the pass was intercepted, dropping the 49ers to a disappointing 2–3 record.

==== Week 6: at Seattle Seahawks ====
Week 6: San Francisco 49ers at Seattle Seahawks – Game summary

Quarter	1	2	3	4	Total
**49ers**	3	13	7	13	**36**
Seahawks	0	3	14	7	**24**

at Lumen Field, Seattle, Washington

- Date: October 10
- Game time: 5:15 p.m. PDT
- Game weather: Mostly sunny, 59 °F (15 °C)
- Game attendance: 68,768
- Referee: Craig Wrolstad
- TV announcers (KTVU/Prime Video): Al Michaels, Kirk Herbstreit and Kaylee Hartung
- Recap, Game Book

Game information

**First quarter**

- SF – Matthew Wright 25-yard field goal, 3:58. 49ers 3–0. **Drive: 13 plays, 90 yards, 7:28.**

**Second quarter**

- SF – Deebo Samuel 76-yard pass from Brock Purdy (Matthew Wright kick), 13:30. 49ers 10–0. **Drive: 1 play, 76 yards, 0:12.**
- SF – Matthew Wright 41-yard field goal, 11:47. 49ers 13–0. **Drive: 4 plays, 6 yards, 1:36.**
- SF – Matthew Wright 35-yard field goal, 2:33. 49ers 16–0. **Drive: 14 plays, 77 yards, 7:43.**
- SEA – Jason Myers 20-yard field goal, 0:00. 49ers 16–3. **Drive: 11 plays, 69 yards, 2:33.**

**Third quarter**

- SF – George Kittle 10-yard pass from Brock Purdy (Matthew Wright kick), 10:07. 49ers 23–3. **Drive: 9 plays, 70 yards, 4:53.**
- SEA – Laviska Shenault Jr. 97-yard kick return (Jason Myers kick), 9:54. 49ers 23–10.
- SEA – Kenneth Walker III 1-yard run (Jason Myers kick), 1:24. 49ers 23–17. **Drive: 13 plays, 94 yards, 5:38.**

**Fourth quarter**

- SF – George Kittle 9-yard pass from Brock Purdy (run failed), 6:20. 49ers 29–17. **Drive: 3 plays, 15 yards, 1:26.**
- SEA – Tyler Lockett 9-yard pass from Geno Smith (Jason Myers kick), 1:44. 49ers 29–24. **Drive: 15 plays, 70 yards, 4:36.**
- SF – Kyle Juszczyk 6-yard run (Matthew Wright kick), 1:17. 49ers 36–24. **Drive: 3 plays, 81 yards, 0:27.**

**Top passers**

- SF – Brock Purdy – 18/28, 255 yards, 3 TD
- SEA – Geno Smith – 30/52, 312 yards, TD, 2 INT

**Top rushers**

- SF – Isaac Guerendo – 10 rushes, 99 yards
- SEA – Kenneth Walker III – 14 rushes, 32 yards, TD

**Top receivers**

- SF – Deebo Samuel – 3 receptions, 102 yards, TD
- SEA – Tyler Lockett – 4 receptions, 65 yards, TD

The 49ers extended their winning streak over the Seahawks to six consecutive games (including playoffs).

==== Week 7: vs. Kansas City Chiefs ====
Week 7: Kansas City Chiefs at San Francisco 49ers – Game summary

Quarter	1	2	3	4	Total
**Chiefs**	0	14	0	14	**28**
49ers	3	3	6	6	**18**

at Levi's Stadium, Santa Clara, California

- Date: October 20
- Game time: 1:25 p.m. PDT
- Game weather: Sunny, 77 °F (25 °C)
- Game attendance: 71,309
- Referee: Alan Eck
- TV announcers (Fox): Kevin Burkhardt, Tom Brady, Erin Andrews and Tom Rinaldi
- Recap, Game Book

Game information

**First quarter**

- SF – Anders Carlson 55-yard field goal, 1:06. 49ers 3–0. **Drive: 4 plays, 22 yards, 0:59.**

**Second quarter**

- KC – Kareem Hunt 1-yard run (Harrison Butker kick), 11:24. Chiefs 7–3. **Drive: 7 plays, 70 yards, 4:42.**
- KC – Kareem Hunt 6-yard run (Harrison Butker kick), 6:45. Chiefs 14–3. **Drive: 7 plays, 30 yards, 3:36.**
- SF – Anders Carlson 24-yard field goal, 0:00. Chiefs 14–6. **Drive: 9 plays, 84 yards, 1:39.**

**Third quarter**

- SF – Brock Purdy 1-yard run (kick failed, hit left upright), 10:29. Chiefs 14–12. **Drive: 7 plays, 23 yards, 3:26.**

**Fourth quarter**

- KC – Patrick Mahomes 1-yard run (Harrison Butker kick), 14:13. Chiefs 21–12. **Drive: 13 plays, 79 yards, 6:43.**
- KC – Mecole Hardman 18-yard run (Harrison Butker kick), 3:09. Chiefs 28–12. **Drive: 12 plays, 80 yards, 6:20.**
- SF – Brock Purdy 1-yard run (pass failed), 1:08. Chiefs 28–18. **Drive: 8 plays, 65 yards, 2:01.**

**Top passers**

- KC – Patrick Mahomes – 16/27, 154 yards, 2 INT
- SF – Brock Purdy – 17/31, 212 yards, 3 INT

**Top rushers**

- KC – Kareem Hunt – 22 rushes, 78 yards, 2 TD
- SF – Jordan Mason – 14 rushes, 58 yards

**Top receivers**

- KC – Noah Gray – 4 receptions, 66 yards
- SF – George Kittle – 6 receptions, 92 yards

In a rematch of Super Bowl LVIII, the 49ers lost once again to the Chiefs, their fifth straight loss to the Chiefs.

==== Week 8: vs. Dallas Cowboys ====
Week 8: Dallas Cowboys at San Francisco 49ers – Game summary

Quarter	1	2	3	4	Total
Cowboys	0	10	0	14	**24**
**49ers**	3	3	21	3	**30**

at Levi's Stadium, Santa Clara, California

- Date: October 27
- Game time: 5:15 p.m. PDT
- Game weather: Cloudy, 69 °F (21 °C)
- Game attendance: 71,521
- Referee: Bill Vinovich
- TV announcers (NBC): Mike Tirico, Cris Collinsworth and Melissa Stark
- Recap, Game Book

Game information

**First quarter**

- SF – Anders Carlson 50-yard field goal, 7:14. 49ers 3–0. **Drive: 7 plays, 55 yards, 4:30.**

**Second quarter**

- DAL – Ezekiel Elliott 1-yard run (Brandon Aubrey kick), 10:58. Cowboys 7–3. **Drive: 11 plays, 65 yards, 6:35.**
- DAL – Brandon Aubrey 29-yard field goal, 2:56. Cowboys 10–3. **Drive: 8 plays, 46 yards, 3:36.**
- SF – Anders Carlson 44-yard field goal, 1:30. Cowboys 10–6. **Drive: 6 plays, 39 yards, 1:26.**

**Third quarter**

- SF – Isaac Guerendo 4-yard run (Anders Carlson kick), 12:57. 49ers 13–10. **Drive: 5 plays, 60 yards, 2:03.**
- SF – George Kittle 2-yard pass from Brock Purdy (Anders Carlson kick), 7:34. 49ers 20–10. **Drive: 7 plays, 32 yards, 4:16.**
- SF – Brock Purdy 2-yard run (Anders Carlson kick), 0:36. 49ers 27–10. **Drive: 9 plays, 75 yards, 5:33.**

**Fourth quarter**

- DAL – CeeDee Lamb 7-yard pass from Dak Prescott (Brandon Aubrey kick), 7:58. 49ers 27–17. **Drive: 10 plays, 70 yards, 3:59.**
- SF – Anders Carlson 41-yard field goal, 4:30. 49ers 30–17. **Drive: 6 plays, 47 yards, 3:33.**
- DAL – CeeDee Lamb 20-yard pass from Dak Prescott (Brandon Aubrey kick), 3:32. 49ers 30–24. **Drive: 4 plays, 70 yards, 0:53.**

**Top passers**

- DAL – Dak Prescott – 25/38, 243 yards, 2 TD, 2 INT
- SF – Brock Purdy – 18/26, 260 yards, TD

**Top rushers**

- DAL – Ezekiel Elliott – 10 rushes, 34 yards, TD
- SF – Isaac Guerendo – 14 rushes, 85 yards, TD

**Top receivers**

- DAL – CeeDee Lamb – 13 receptions, 146 yards, 2 TD
- SF – George Kittle – 6 receptions, 128 yards, TD

The 49ers defeated the Cowboys for the fourth consecutive season (including playoffs), and improved to 4–4.

==== Week 10: at Tampa Bay Buccaneers ====
Week 10: San Francisco 49ers at Tampa Bay Buccaneers – Game summary

Quarter	1	2	3	4	Total
**49ers**	7	3	3	10	**23**
Buccaneers	0	3	7	10	**20**

at Raymond James Stadium, Tampa, Florida

- Date: November 10
- Game time: 1:00 p.m. EST/10:00 a.m. PST
- Game weather: Cloudy, 85 °F (29 °C)
- Game attendance: 64,914
- Referee: Shawn Smith
- TV announcers (Fox): Kevin Burkhardt, Tom Brady, Erin Andrews and Tom Rinaldi
- Recap, Game Book

Game information

**First quarter**

- SF – Ricky Pearsall 46-yard pass from Brock Purdy (Jake Moody kick), 4:15. 49ers 7–0. **Drive: 6 plays, 71 yards, 3:51.**

**Second quarter**

- SF – Jake Moody 28-yard field goal, 8:53. 49ers 10–0. **Drive: 14 plays, 77 yards, 8:14.**
- TB – Chase McLaughlin 30-yard field goal, 1:14. 49ers 10–3. **Drive: 13 plays, 58 yards, 7:39.**

**Third quarter**

- TB – Rachaad White 9-yard pass from Baker Mayfield (Chase McLaughlin kick), 11:58. Tied 10–10. **Drive: 4 plays, 21 yards, 1:57.**
- SF – Jake Moody 33-yard field goal, 4:21. 49ers 13–10. **Drive: 13 plays, 55 yards, 7:37.**

Fourth quarter'

- TB – Bucky Irving 12-yard run (Chase McLaughlin kick), 14:18. Buccaneers 17–13. **Drive: 14 plays, 70 yards, 5:03.**
- SF – George Kittle 11-yard pass from Brock Purdy (Jake Moody kick), 7:02. 49ers 20–17. **Drive: 6 plays, 64 yards, 3:15.**
- TB – Chase McLaughlin 26-yard field goal, 0:41. Tied 20–20. **Drive: 11 plays, 58 yards, 2:28.**
- SF – Jake Moody 44-yard field goal, 0:00. 49ers 23–20. **Drive: 6 plays, 39 yards, 0:41.**

**Top passers**

- SF – Brock Purdy – 25/36, 253 yards, 2 TD
- TB – Baker Mayfield – 18/29, 116 yards, TD

**Top rushers**

- SF – Christian McCaffrey – 13 rushes, 39 yards
- TB – Bucky Irving – 13 rushes, 73 yards, TD

**Top receivers**

- SF – Jauan Jennings – 7 receptions, 93 yards
- TB – Rachaad White – 6 receptions, 39 yards, TD

Despite 3 missed field goals on the day by Jake Moody, he was able to deliver at the end and the 49ers escaped Tampa with a 23–20 win to improve to 5–4.

==== Week 11: vs. Seattle Seahawks ====
Week 11: Seattle Seahawks at San Francisco 49ers – Game summary

Quarter	1	2	3	4	Total
**Seahawks**	3	3	7	7	**20**
49ers	7	0	3	7	**17**

at Levi's Stadium, Santa Clara, California

- Date: November 17
- Game time: 1:05 p.m. PST
- Game weather: Cloudy, 59 °F (15 °C)
- Game attendance: 71,751
- Referee: Brad Rogers
- TV announcers (Fox): Joe Davis, Greg Olsen and Pam Oliver
- Recap, Game Book

Game information

**First quarter**

- SEA – Jason Myers 52-yard field goal, 8:13. Seahawks 3–0. **Drive: 9 plays, 44 yards, 4:33.**
- SF – Brock Purdy 10-yard run (Jake Moody kick), 0:10. 49ers 7–3. **Drive: 12 plays, 71 yards, 8:03.**

**Second quarter**

- SEA – Jason Myers 57-yard field goal, 8:41. 49ers 7–6. **Drive: 4 plays, -10 yards, 1:28.**

**Third quarter**

- SF – Jake Moody 33-yard field goal, 9:26. 49ers 10–6. **Drive: 7 plays, 12 yards, 4:31.**
- SEA – Kenneth Walker III 1-yard run (Jason Myers kick), 3:25. Seahawks 13–10. **Drive: 11 plays, 70 yards, 6:01.**

**Fourth quarter**

- SF – Jauan Jennings 3-yard pass from Brock Purdy (Jake Moody kick), 9:33. 49ers 17–13. **Drive: 14 plays, 70 yards, 8:52.**
- SEA – Geno Smith 13-yard run (Jason Myers kick), 0:12. Seahawks 20–17. **Drive: 11 plays, 80 yards, 2:26.**

**Top passers**

- SEA – Geno Smith – 25/32, 221 yards, INT
- SF – Brock Purdy – 21/28, 159 yards, TD, INT

**Top rushers**

- SEA – Kenneth Walker III – 14 rushes, 54 yards, TD
- SF – Christian McCaffrey – 19 rushes, 79 yards

**Top receivers**

- SEA – Jaxon Smith-Njigba – 10 receptions, 110 yards
- SF – Jauan Jennings – 10 receptions, 91 yards, TD

This loss snapped the 49ers' six-game winning streak against the Seahawks, and was their first loss to the Seahawks since Russell Wilson was traded from Seattle.

==== Week 12: at Green Bay Packers ====
Week 12: San Francisco 49ers at Green Bay Packers – Game summary

Quarter	1	2	3	4	Total
49ers	0	7	3	0	**10**
**Packers**	10	7	7	14	**38**

at Lambeau Field, Green Bay, Wisconsin

- Date: November 24
- Game time: 3:25 p.m. CST/1:25 p.m. PST
- Game weather: Cloudy, 43 °F (6 °C)
- Game attendance: 78,222
- Referee: Craig Wrolstad
- TV announcers (Fox): Kevin Burkhardt, Tom Brady, Erin Andrews and Tom Rinaldi
- Recap, Game Book

Game information

**First quarter**

- GB – Tucker Kraft 11-yard pass from Jordan Love (Brandon McManus kick), 7:35. Packers 7–0. **Drive: 12 plays, 67 yards, 7:25.**
- GB – Brandon McManus 51-yard field goal, 0:11. Packers 10–0. **Drive: 10 plays, 49 yards, 4:44.**

**Second quarter**

- GB – Josh Jacobs 1-yard run (Brandon McManus kick), 6:33. Packers 17–0. **Drive: 12 plays, 71 yards, 6:56.**
- SF – George Kittle 3-yard pass from Brandon Allen (Jake Moody kick), 1:02. Packers 17–7. **Drive: 11 plays, 65 yards, 5:31.**

**Third quarter**

- GB – Josh Jacobs 1-yard run (Brandon McManus kick), 4:28. Packers 24–7. **Drive: 3 plays, 26 yards, 1:21.**
- SF – Jake Moody 48-yard field goal, 2:12. Packers 24–10. **Drive: 6 plays, 44 yards, 2:16.**

**Fourth quarter**

- GB – Josh Jacobs 1-yard run (Brandon McManus kick), 10:59. Packers 31–10. **Drive: 3 plays, 16 yards, 1:31.**
- GB – Malik Heath 3-yard pass from Jordan Love (Brandon McManus kick), 4:14. Packers 38–10. **Drive: 10 plays, 56 yards, 6:37.**

**Top passers**

- SF – Brandon Allen – 17/29, 199 yards, TD, INT
- GB – Jordan Love – 13/23, 163 yards, 2 TD

**Top rushers**

- SF – Christian McCaffrey – 11 rushes, 31 yards
- GB – Josh Jacobs – 26 rushes, 106 yards, 3 TD

**Top receivers**

- SF – George Kittle – 6 receptions, 82 yards, TD
- GB – Romeo Doubs – 3 receptions, 54 yards

The 49ers then traveled to Lambeau Field for a rematch of last season's divisional round game with the Green Bay Packers. However, due to Brock Purdy, Trent Williams and Nick Bosa sitting out due to injuries, the 49ers were dominated by the Packers 38–10, falling to 5–6. The 28-point margin marked the 49ers' largest loss to the Packers in 74 meetings.

==== Week 13: at Buffalo Bills ====
Week 13: San Francisco 49ers at Buffalo Bills – Game summary

Quarter	1	2	3	4	Total
49ers	3	0	7	0	**10**
**Bills**	7	14	7	7	**35**

at Highmark Stadium, Orchard Park, New York

- Date: December 1
- Game time: 8:20 p.m. EST/5:20 p.m. PST
- Game weather: Snow, 28 °F (−2 °C)
- Game attendance: 70,437
- Referee: Alex Kemp
- TV announcers (NBC): Mike Tirico, Cris Collinsworth and Melissa Stark
- Recap, Game Book

Game information

**First quarter**

- SF – Jake Moody 33-yard field goal, 7:41. 49ers 3–0. **Drive: 9 plays, 48 yards, 4:40.**
- BUF – Ray Davis 5-yard run (Tyler Bass kick), 0:03. Bills 7–3. **Drive: 13 plays, 70 yards, 7:38.**

**Second quarter**

- BUF – James Cook 65-yard run (Tyler Bass kick), 8:38. Bills 14–3. **Drive: 1 play, 65 yards, 0:10.**
- BUF – Mack Hollins 7-yard pass from Josh Allen (Tyler Bass kick), 0:41. Bills 21–3. **Drive: 9 plays, 97 yards, 2:50.**

**Third quarter**

- BUF – Josh Allen 7-yard pass play by Josh Allen (Tyler Bass kick), 5:58. Bills 28–3. **Drive: 6 plays, 44 yards, 3:05.**
- SF – Isaac Guerendo 15-yard run (Jake Moody kick), 2:54. Bills 28–10. **Drive: 6 plays, 48 yards, 3:04.**

**Fourth quarter**

- BUF – Josh Allen 8-yard run (Tyler Bass kick), 12:31. Bills 35–10. **Drive: 4 plays, 25 yards, 2:22.**

**Top passers**

- SF – Brock Purdy – 11/18, 94 yards
- BUF – Josh Allen – 13/17, 148 yards, 2 TD

**Top rushers**

- SF – Jordan Mason – 13 rushes, 78 yards
- BUF – James Cook – 14 rushes, 107 yards, TD

**Top receivers**

- SF – Jauan Jennings – 3 receptions, 56 yards
- BUF – Dawson Knox – 2 receptions, 56 yards

The 49ers were thoroughly dominated in snowy Buffalo and fell to 5–7.

==== Week 14: vs. Chicago Bears ====
Week 14: Chicago Bears at San Francisco 49ers – Game summary

Quarter	1	2	3	4	Total
Bears	0	0	6	7	**13**
**49ers**	14	10	0	14	**38**

at Levi's Stadium, Santa Clara, California

- Date: December 8
- Game time: 1:25 p.m. PST
- Game weather: Sunny, 65 °F (18 °C)
- Game attendance: 71,662
- Referee: Ronald Torbert
- TV announcers (Fox): Kenny Albert, Jonathan Vilma and Megan Olivi
- Recap, Game Book

Game information

**First quarter**

- SF – Jauan Jennings 7-yard pass from Brock Purdy (Jake Moody kick), 12:20. 49ers 7–0. **Drive: 5 plays, 70 yards, 2:40.**
- SF – Isaac Guerendo 1-yard run (Jake Moody kick), 1:39. 49ers 14–0. **Drive: 4 plays, 64 yards, 2:11.**

**Second quarter**

- SF – Jauan Jennings 16-yard pass from Brock Purdy (Jake Moody kick), 7:41. 49ers 21–0. **Drive: 12 plays, 71 yards, 7:24.**
- SF – Jake Moody 23-yard field goal, 1:50. 49ers 24–0. **Drive: 9 plays, 69 yards, 3:44.**

**Third quarter**

- CHI – Rome Odunze 4-yard pass from Caleb Williams (pass failed), 5:56. 49ers 24–6. **Drive: 16 plays, 70 yards, 9:04.**

**Fourth quarter**

- SF – Isaac Guerendo 4-yard run (Jake Moody kick), 14:57. 49ers 31–6. **Drive: 5 plays, 62 yards, 2:43.**
- CHI – Rome Odunze 14-yard pass from Caleb Williams (Cairo Santos kick), 11:48. 49ers 31–13. **Drive: 6 plays, 60 yards, 3:09.**
- SF – Patrick Taylor Jr. 3-yard run (Jake Moody kick), 5:15. 49ers 38–13. **Drive: 13 plays, 70 yards, 6:33.**

**Top passers**

- CHI – Caleb Williams – 17/23, 134 yards, 2 TD
- SF – Brock Purdy – 20/25, 325 yards, 2 TD

**Top rushers**

- CHI – D'Andre Swift – 14 rushes, 38 yards
- SF – Isaac Guerendo – 15 rushes, 78 yards, 2 TD

**Top receivers**

- CHI – D. J. Moore – 6 receptions, 49 yards
- SF – George Kittle – 6 receptions, 151 yards

==== Week 15: vs. Los Angeles Rams ====
Week 15: Los Angeles Rams at San Francisco 49ers – Game summary

Quarter	1	2	3	4	Total
**Rams**	0	3	0	9	**12**
49ers	3	0	3	0	**6**

at Levi's Stadium, Santa Clara, California

- Date: December 12
- Game time: 5:15 p.m. PST
- Game weather: Rain, 53 °F (12 °C)
- Game attendance: 71,201
- Referee: Clay Martin
- TV announcers (KTVU/Prime Video): Al Michaels, Kirk Herbstreit and Kaylee Hartung
- Recap, Game Book

Game information

**First quarter**

- SF – Jake Moody 53-yard field goal, 10:01. 49ers 3–0. **Drive: 5 plays, 39 yards, 2:47.**

**Second quarter**

- LAR – Joshua Karty 48-yard field goal, 1:05. Tied 3–3. **Drive: 7 plays, 20 yards, 3:47.**

**Third quarter**

- SF – Jake Moody 47-yard field goal, 8:23. 49ers 6–3. **Drive: 10 plays, 34 yards, 4:49.**

**Fourth quarter**

- LAR – Joshua Karty 23-yard field goal, 13:38. Tied 6–6. **Drive: 17 plays, 65 yards, 9:45.**
- LAR – Joshua Karty 27-yard field goal, 9:28. Rams 9–6. **Drive: 5 plays, 59 yards, 3:00.**
- LAR – Joshua Karty 29-yard field goal, 0:18. Rams 12–6. **Drive: 13 plays, 69 yards, 4:56.**

**Top passers**

- LAR – Matthew Stafford – 16/27, 160 yards
- SF – Brock Purdy – 14/31, 142 yards, INT

**Top rushers**

- LAR – Kyren Williams – 29 rushes, 108 yards
- SF – Isaac Guerendo – 16 rushes, 57 yards

**Top receivers**

- LAR – Puka Nacua – 7 receptions, 97 yards
- SF – George Kittle – 4 receptions, 61 yards

With the loss, the 49ers fell to 6–8, and were swept by the Rams for the first time since 2018.

==== Week 16: at Miami Dolphins ====
Week 16: San Francisco 49ers at Miami Dolphins – Game summary

Quarter	1	2	3	4	Total
49ers	0	10	0	7	**17**
**Dolphins**	3	10	6	10	**29**

at Hard Rock Stadium, Miami Gardens, Florida

- Date: December 22
- Game time: 4:25 p.m. EST/1:25 p.m. PST
- Game weather: Mostly cloudy, 73 °F (23 °C)
- Game attendance: 66,341
- Referee: Scott Novak
- TV announcers (CBS): Jim Nantz, Tony Romo and Tracy Wolfson
- Recap, Game Book

Game information

**First quarter**

- MIA – Jason Sanders 44-yard field goal, 3:30. Dolphins 3–0. **Drive: 8 plays, 44 yards, 4:00.**

**Second quarter**

- SF – Deebo Samuel 16-yard pass from Brock Purdy (Jake Moody kick), 14:14. 49ers 7–3. **Drive: 10 plays, 70 yards, 4:16.**
- MIA – Jason Sanders 38-yard field goal, 9:40. 49ers 7–6. **Drive: 11 plays, 49 yards, 4:34.**
- MIA – Tyreek Hill 3-yard pass from Tua Tagovailoa (Jason Sanders kick), 3:20. Dolphins 13–7. **Drive: 8 plays, 68 yards, 4:33.**
- SF – Jake Moody 21-yard field goal, 0:47. Dolphins 13–10. **Drive: 9 plays, 67 yards, 2:33.**

**Third quarter**

- MIA – Jason Sanders 54-yard field goal, 10:57. Dolphins 16–10. **Drive: 8 plays, 34 yards, 4:03.**
- MIA – Jason Sanders 33-yard field goal, 1:08. Dolphins 19–10. **Drive: 9 plays, 54 yards, 4:45.**

**Fourth quarter**

- SF – Eric Saubert 2-yard pass from Brock Purdy (Jake Moody kick), 12:02. Dolphins 19–17. **Drive: 9 plays, 60 yards, 4:06.**
- MIA – Jason Sanders 48-yard field goal, 2:10. Dolphins 22–17. **Drive: 7 plays, 41 yards, 4:27.**
- MIA – De'Von Achane 50-yard run (Jason Sanders kick), 1:36. Dolphins 29–17. **Drive: 3 plays, 62 yards, 0:20.**

**Top passers**

- SF – Brock Purdy – 26/40, 313 yards, 2 TD, INT
- MIA – Tua Tagovailoa – 22/34, 215 yards, TD

**Top rushers**

- SF – Brock Purdy – 4 rushes, 26 yards
- MIA – De'Von Achane – 17 rushes, 120 yards, TD

**Top receivers**

- SF – George Kittle – 8 receptions, 106 yards
- MIA – De'Von Achane – 6 receptions, 70 yards

Shortly before this game kicked off, the 49ers were eliminated from playoff contention after wins by the Rams and Commanders. The 49ers lost 29–17 to the Dolphins, falling to 6–9 and suffering their first losing season since 2020.

==== Week 17: vs. Detroit Lions ====
Week 17: Detroit Lions at San Francisco 49ers – Game summary

Quarter	1	2	3	4	Total
**Lions**	6	7	18	9	**40**
49ers	7	14	7	6	**34**

at Levi's Stadium, Santa Clara, California

- Date: December 30
- Game time: 5:15 p.m. PST
- Game weather: 48 °F (9 °C)
- Game attendance: 71,688
- Referee: Shawn Hochuli
- TV announcers (ESPN/ABC): Joe Buck, Troy Aikman and Lisa Salters
- Recap, Game Book

Game information

**First quarter**

- SF – Ricky Pearsall 3-yard pass from Brock Purdy (Jake Moody kick), 8:37. 49ers 7–0. **Drive: 11 plays, 61 yards, 6:23.**
- DET – Jameson Williams 3-yard run (kick blocked), 3:42. 49ers 7–6. **Drive: 9 plays, 65 yards, 4:55.**

**Second quarter**

- SF – Kyle Juszczyk 9-yard pass from Brock Purdy (Jake Moody kick), 14:53. 49ers 14–6. **Drive: 6 plays, 70 yards, 3:49.**
- DET – Jameson Williams 41-yard pass from Jared Goff (Jake Bates kick), 10:09. 49ers 14–13. **Drive: 8 plays, 75 yards, 4:44.**
- SF – Brock Purdy 9-yard run (Jake Moody kick), 6:13. 49ers 21–13. **Drive: 7 plays, 70 yards, 3:56.**

**Third quarter**

- DET – Sam LaPorta 6-yard pass from Jared Goff (Jared Goff-Tim Patrick pass), 9:58. Tied 21–21. **Drive: 10 plays, 66 yards, 5:02.**
- SF – Deebo Samuel 5-yard pass from Brock Purdy (Jake Moody kick), 7:40. 49ers 28–21. **Drive: 6 plays, 84 yards, 2:18.**
- DET – Jake Bates 57-yard field goal, 4:25. 49ers 28–24. **Drive: 6 plays, 31 yards, 3:15.**
- DET – Amon-Ra St. Brown 4-yard pass from Jared Goff (Jake Bates kick), 0:19. Lions 31–28. **Drive: 8 plays, 43 yards, 3:39.**

**Fourth quarter**

- DET – Jake Bates 42-yard field goal, 10:29. Lions 34–28. **Drive: 8 plays, 28 yards, 2:56.**
- DET – Jahmyr Gibbs 30-yard run (kick failed, wide left), 2:58. Lions 40–28. **Drive: 7 plays, 62 yards, 4:36.**
- SF – Joshua Dobbs 7-yard run (kick failed, wide right), 0:43. Lions 40–34. **Drive: 11 plays, 72 yards, 2:15.**

**Top passers**

- DET – Jared Goff – 26/34, 303 yards, 3 TD
- SF – Brock Purdy – 27/35, 377 yards, 3 TD, 2 INT

**Top rushers**

- DET – Jahmyr Gibbs – 18 rushes, 117 yards, TD
- SF – Isaac Guerendo – 9 rushes, 34 yards

**Top receivers**

- DET – Jameson Williams – 5 receptions, 77 yards, TD
- SF – Ricky Pearsall – 8 receptions, 141 yards, TD

The 49ers lost to the Lions in a rematch of the previous season's NFC Championship Game, with quarterback Brock Purdy exiting late in the game due to an arm injury. With the loss, the 49ers were defeated by the Lions at home for the first time since the 1975 season, ending a 14-game home winning streak against Detroit.

==== Week 18: at Arizona Cardinals ====
Week 18: San Francisco 49ers at Arizona Cardinals – Game summary

Quarter	1	2	3	4	Total
49ers	3	14	7	0	**24**
**Cardinals**	3	17	6	21	**47**

at State Farm Stadium, Glendale, Arizona

- Date: January 5
- Game time: 2:25 p.m. MST/1:25 p.m. PST
- Game weather: Sunny, 68 °F (20 °C) (retractable roof open)
- Game attendance: 63,849
- Referee: Shawn Smith
- TV announcers (Fox): Chris Myers, Mark Schlereth and Jen Hale
- Recap, Game Book

Game information

**First quarter**

- SF – Jake Moody 51-yard field goal, 12:48. 49ers 3–0. **Drive: 6 plays, 37 yards, 2:12.**
- ARI – Chad Ryland 51-yard field goal, 0:56. Tied 3–3. **Drive: 8 plays, 30 yards, 2:45.**

**Second quarter**

- ARI – Greg Dortch 23-yard pass from Kyler Murray (Chad Ryland kick), 12:55. Cardinals 10–3. **Drive: 7 plays, 45 yards, 2:16.**
- SF – Joshua Dobbs 1-yard run (Jake Moody kick), 5:43. Tied 10–10. **Drive: 8 plays, 74 yards, 4:10.**
- ARI – Trey McBride 2-yard pass from Kyler Murray (Chad Ryland kick), 1:51. Cardinals 17–10. **Drive: 8 plays, 70 yards, 3:52.**
- SF – Ricky Pearsall 6-yard pass from Joshua Dobbs (Jake Moody kick), 0:16. Tied 17–17. **Drive: 10 plays, 70 yards, 1:35.**
- ARI – Chad Ryland 49-yard field goal, 0:00. Cardinals 20–17. **Drive: 4 plays, 39 yards, 0:16.**

**Third quarter**

- ARI – Greg Dortch 2-yard pass from Kyler Murray (run failed), 8:28. Cardinals 26–17. **Drive: 6 plays, 49 yards, 3:13.**
- SF – Kyle Juszczyk 36-yard pass from Joshua Dobbs (Jake Moody kick), 4:49. Cardinals 26–24. **Drive: 7 plays, 70 yards, 3:39.**

**Fourth quarter**

- ARI – Michael Carter 4-yard run (Chad Ryland kick), 14:16. Cardinals 33–24. **Drive: 10 plays, 70 yards, 5:33.**
- ARI – Marvin Harrison Jr. 12-yard pass from Kyler Murray (Chad Ryland kick), 5:47. Cardinals 40–24. **Drive: 2 plays, 39 yards, 0:51.**
- ARI – Tony Jones Jr. 46-yard run (Chad Ryland kick), 1:47. Cardinals 47–24. **Drive: 5 plays, 57 yards, 2:16.**

**Top passers**

- SF – Joshua Dobbs – 29/43, 326 yards, 2 TD, 2 INT
- ARI – Kyler Murray – 25/35, 242 yards, 4 TD

**Top rushers**

- SF – Patrick Taylor – 17 rushes, 109 yards
- ARI – Tony Jones Jr. – 4 rushes, 55 yards, TD

**Top receivers**

- SF – Ricky Pearsall – 6 receptions, 69 yards, TD
- ARI – Trey McBride – 7 receptions, 65 yards, TD

The 49ers finished their disappointing season 6–11, and were swept by the Cardinals for the first time since 2021. The loss also ensured a last place finish in the NFC West for the first time since 2020, and the 11 losses were the most for the 49ers since 2018.

=== Standings ===
==== Division ====
NFC West
	W	L	T	PCT	DIV	CONF	PF	PA	STK
^{(4)} Los Angeles Rams	10	7	0	.588	4–2	6–6	367	386	L1
Seattle Seahawks	10	7	0	.588	4–2	6–6	375	368	W2
Arizona Cardinals	8	9	0	.471	3–3	4–8	400	379	W1
San Francisco 49ers	6	11	0	.353	1–5	4–8	389	436	L4

==== Conference ====
NFC
Seed	Team	Division	W	L	T	PCT	DIV	CONF	SOS	SOV	STK
**Division leaders**
1	Detroit Lions	North	15	2	0	.882	6–0	11–1	.516	.494	W3
2	Philadelphia Eagles	East	14	3	0	.824	5–1	9–3	.453	.424	W2
3 (Note: Tampa Bay clinched the #3 seed over Los Angeles based on conference record. (Tampa Bay 8–4 to Los Angeles 6–6))	Tampa Bay Buccaneers	South	10	7	0	.588	4–2	8–4	.502	.465	W2
4 (Note: Los Angeles clinched the NFC West and #4 seed over Seattle based on strength of victory. (Los Angeles .441 to Seattle .424))	Los Angeles Rams	West	10	7	0	.588	4–2	6–6	.505	.441	L1
**Wild cards**
5	Minnesota Vikings	North	14	3	0	.824	4–2	9–3	.474	.408	L1
6	Washington Commanders	East	12	5	0	.706	4–2	9–3	.436	.358	W5
7	Green Bay Packers	North	11	6	0	.647	1–5	6–6	.533	.412	L2
**Did not qualify for the postseason**
8	Seattle Seahawks	West	10	7	0	.588	4–2	6–6	.498	.424	W2
9 (Note: Atlanta finished ahead of Arizona based on conference record. (Atlanta 7–5 to Arizona 4–8))	Atlanta Falcons	South	8	9	0	.471	4–2	7–5	.519	.426	L2
10	Arizona Cardinals	West	8	9	0	.471	3–3	4–8	.536	.404	W1
11	Dallas Cowboys	East	7	10	0	.412	3–3	5–7	.522	.387	L2
12	San Francisco 49ers	West	6	11	0	.353	1–5	4–8	.564	.402	L4
13 (Note: Chicago finished ahead of Carolina based on head-to-head victory.)	Chicago Bears	North	5	12	0	.294	1–5	3–9	.554	.388	W1
14 (Note: Carolina finished ahead of New Orleans based on strength of victory. (Carolina .329 to New Orleans .306))	Carolina Panthers	South	5	12	0	.294	2–4	4–8	.498	.329	W1
15	New Orleans Saints	South	5	12	0	.294	2–4	4–8	.505	.306	L4
16	New York Giants	East	3	14	0	.176	0–6	1–11	.554	.412	L1
**Tiebreakers** (Note: When breaking ties for three or more teams under the NFL's rules, they are first broken within divisions, then comparing only the highest ranked remaining team from each division.)
