= Eric Saubert =

American football player (born 1994)

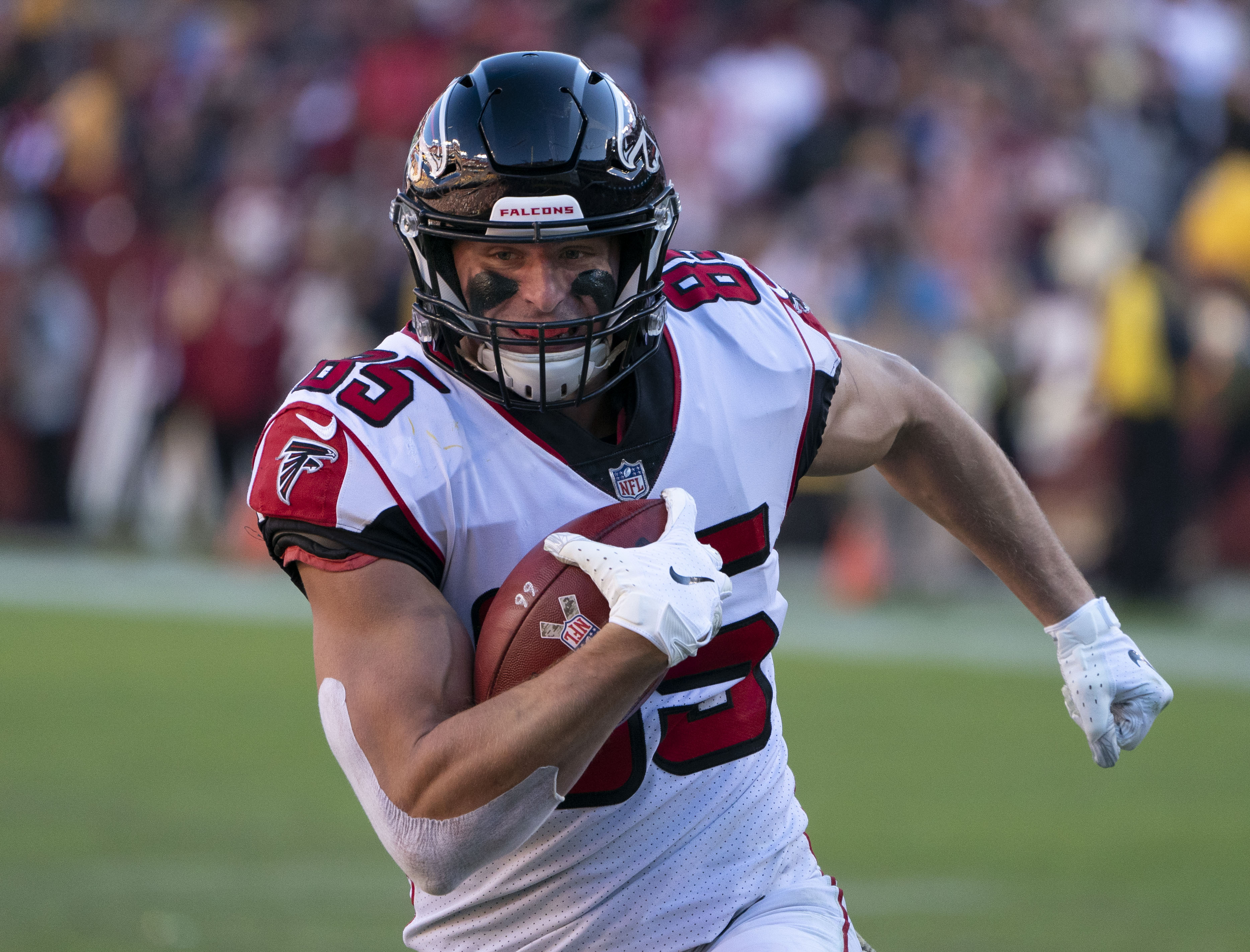
- Saubert with the Atlanta Falcons in 2018

No. 81 – Seattle Seahawks
- Position: Tight end
- Roster status: Active

Personal information
- Born: May 9, 1994 (age 32); Chicago, Illinois, U.S.
- Listed height: 6 ft 5 in (1.96 m)
- Listed weight: 248 lb (112 kg)

Career information
- High school: Hoffman Estates (Hoffman Estates, Illinois)
- College: Drake (2012–2016)
- NFL draft: 2017: 5th round, 174th overall pick

Career history
- Atlanta Falcons (2017–2018); New England Patriots (2019)*; Oakland Raiders (2019)*; Chicago Bears (2019–2020); Jacksonville Jaguars (2020); Denver Broncos (2021–2022); Miami Dolphins (2023)*; Dallas Cowboys (2023); Houston Texans (2023); San Francisco 49ers (2024); Seattle Seahawks (2025–present)
- * Offseason or practice squad member only

Awards and highlights
- Super Bowl champion (LX)

Career NFL statistics as of Week 10, 2026
- Receptions: 54
- Receiving yards: 440
- Receiving touchdowns: 4
- Stats at Pro Football Reference

Eric Saubert (born May 9, 1994) is an American professional football tight end for the Seattle Seahawks of the National Football League (NFL). He played college football for the Drake Bulldogs, and was selected by the Atlanta Falcons in the fifth round of the 2017 NFL draft. Saubert has also been a member of several other NFL teams.

== Professional career ==
=== Pre-draft ===
On December 5, 2016, it was announced that Saubert had accepted an invitation to play in the 2017 East–West Shrine Game. He impressed scouts and analysts throughout practices for the Shrine Game, displaying his athleticism, receiving ability, and received praises from multiple media members, including NFL analyst Mike Mayock. On January 21, 2017, Saubert played in the East–West Shrine Game and was part of an East team that lost 10–3 to the West, but he was unable to record a reception although he was targeted twice. Five days later, it was announced that Saubert would be a late addition to play in the 2017 Senior Bowl. He attended two days later and was a part of Cleveland Browns head coach Hue Jackson's South team that defeated the North 16–15. He was unable to record a reception with top draft prospects O. J. Howard, David Njoku, and Gerald Everett on his team and only having a day of practice. Saubert was one of 19 collegiate tight ends to receive an invitation to the NFL Scouting Combine in Indianapolis, Indiana. He tied for second amongst his position group in the bench press, fifth in the broad jump, and eighth in the vertical jump and opted to only perform those drills. On March 28, 2017, Saubert attended Iowa State's pro day and performed all of the combine drills and positional drills. He ran receiving drills with Cincinnati Bengals tight ends coach Jonathan Hayes for the 33 team representatives and scouts who attended from 22 NFL teams. At the conclusion of the pre-draft process, Saubert was projected to be a fifth or sixth round pick by NFL draft experts and scouts. He was ranked the 12th best tight end prospect in the draft by CBS Sports and was ranked the 13th best tight end by NFLDraftScout.com.

Pre-draft measurables
Height	Weight	Arm length	Hand span	Wingspan	40-yard dash	10-yard split	20-yard split	20-yard shuttle	Three-cone drill	Vertical jump	Broad jump	Bench press	Wonderlic
6 ft 4 3/4 in (1.95 m)	253 lb (115 kg)	33 1/2 in (0.85 m)	10 3/8 in (0.26 m)	6 ft 9 in (2.06 m)	4.69 s	1.63 s	2.72 s	4.59 s	7.34 s	35.5 in (0.90 m)	10 ft 1 in (3.07 m)	22 reps	35
All values from NFL Combine/Iowa State's Pro Day

=== Atlanta Falcons ===
The Atlanta Falcons selected Saubert in the fifth round (174th overall) of the 2017 NFL draft. He was the first player selected from Drake since Pat Dunsmore was selected in the fourth round (183rd overall) of the 1983 NFL draft. Saubert was the 20th player drafted in Drake University history. He was the 12th tight end drafted in 2017. On May 11, 2017, the Falcons signed Saubert to a four-year, $2.62 million contract that includes a signing bonus of $227,388.

With the departure of Jacob Tamme in free agency, Saubert competed for the starting tight end job throughout training camp, against Austin Hooper and Levine Toilolo. Head coach Dan Quinn named him the third string tight end to begin the regular season.

Saubert made his professional regular season debut in the season-opening 23–17 victory at the Chicago Bears. He played in 14 games his rookie year but recorded no statistics.

In 2018, Saubert had five receptions for 48 yards in 16 games and one start.

=== New England Patriots ===
On August 12, 2019, Saubert was traded to the New England Patriots for a conditional seventh-round draft pick in the 2020 NFL draft. He was released during final roster cuts on August 31.

=== Oakland Raiders ===
Saubert signed with the Oakland Raiders' practice squad on September 1, 2019.

=== Chicago Bears ===
On November 30, 2019, Saubert was signed by the Chicago Bears off the Raiders practice squad. He caught two passes for 21 yards during the 2019 season.

Saubert was placed on the reserve/COVID-19 list by the Bears on July 29, 2020, and activated from the list five days later. He was waived on September 16.

=== Jacksonville Jaguars ===
On September 19, 2020, Saubert was signed to the Jacksonville Jaguars' practice squad. He was elevated to the active roster on October 24 for the team's Week 7 game against the Los Angeles Chargers, and reverted to the practice squad after the game. Saubert was signed to the active roster on November 21.

=== Denver Broncos ===
Saubert signed with the Denver Broncos on May 3, 2021. He made the active roster as the third TE on the depth chart and recorded one catch for 7 yards in Week 1 against the New York Giants. After posting just a single catch in Week 2 and no stats from Weeks 3 to 5, Saubert had a career day in the Week 6 loss to the Las Vegas Raiders with three receptions for 27 yards and an onside kick recovery. He caught his first NFL touchdown in the Week 12 victory over the Chargers.

On May 4, 2022, Saubert re-signed with the Broncos.

=== Miami Dolphins ===
On March 17, 2023, Saubert signed a one-year contract with the Miami Dolphins. He was placed on injured reserve on August 29, then released a week later.

=== Dallas Cowboys ===
On October 24, 2023, the Dallas Cowboys signed Saubert to their practice squad. He appeared in his only game during the Week 8 matchup against the Rams.

=== Houston Texans ===
On October 31, 2023, Saubert was signed by the Houston Texans off the Cowboys practice squad.

=== San Francisco 49ers ===
On April 8, 2024, Saubert signed with the San Francisco 49ers.

=== Seattle Seahawks ===
On March 24, 2025, Saubert signed with the Seattle Seahawks. He was placed on injured reserve on November 1 due to a calf injury. Saubert was activated on December 13. That same day, he received a one-year contract extension from the Seahawks. Five days later against the Los Angeles Rams, Saubert caught a game-winning two-point conversion in overtime. This two-point conversion helped the Seahawks secure a playoff spot for the first time since the 2022 season. Saubert started in Super Bowl LX, a 29–13 win over the New England Patriots.

== NFL career statistics ==
Legend
**Bold**	Career high

=== Regular season ===
Year	Team	Games		Receiving					Returning					Fumbles	
Year	Team	GP	GS	Rec	Yds	Avg	Lng	TD	Ret	Yds	Avg	Lng	TD	Fum	Lost
2017	ATL	14	0	0	0	0.0	0	0	0	0	0.0	0	0	0	0
2018	ATL	16	1	5	48	9.6	17	0	0	0	0.0	0	0	0	0
2019	CHI	2	0	2	21	**10.5**	11	0	0	0	0.0	0	0	0	0
2020	JAX	8	4	3	16	5.3	9	0	0	0	0.0	0	0	0	0
2021	DEN	**17**	4	8	47	5.9	11	**1**	0	0	0.0	0	0	0	0
2022	DEN	**17**	**6**	**15**	**148**	9.9	**25**	**1**	**2**	**21**	**10.5**	**15**	0	0	0
2023	DAL	1	0	0	0	0.0	0	0	0	0	0.0	0	0	0	0
2023	HOU	9	1	3	12	4.0	5	0	0	0	0.0	0	0	0	0
2024	SF	**17**	3	11	97	8.8	17	**1**	0	0	0.0	0	0	**1**	0
2025	SEA	11	5	4	31	7.8	12	0	0	0	0.0	0	0	0	0
2026	SEA	10	5	3	20	6.7	17	1	0	0	0.0	0	0	**1**	0
Career		122	29	54	440	8.1	25	4	2	21	10.5	15	0	2	0
