= Isaac Guerendo =

American football player (born 2000)

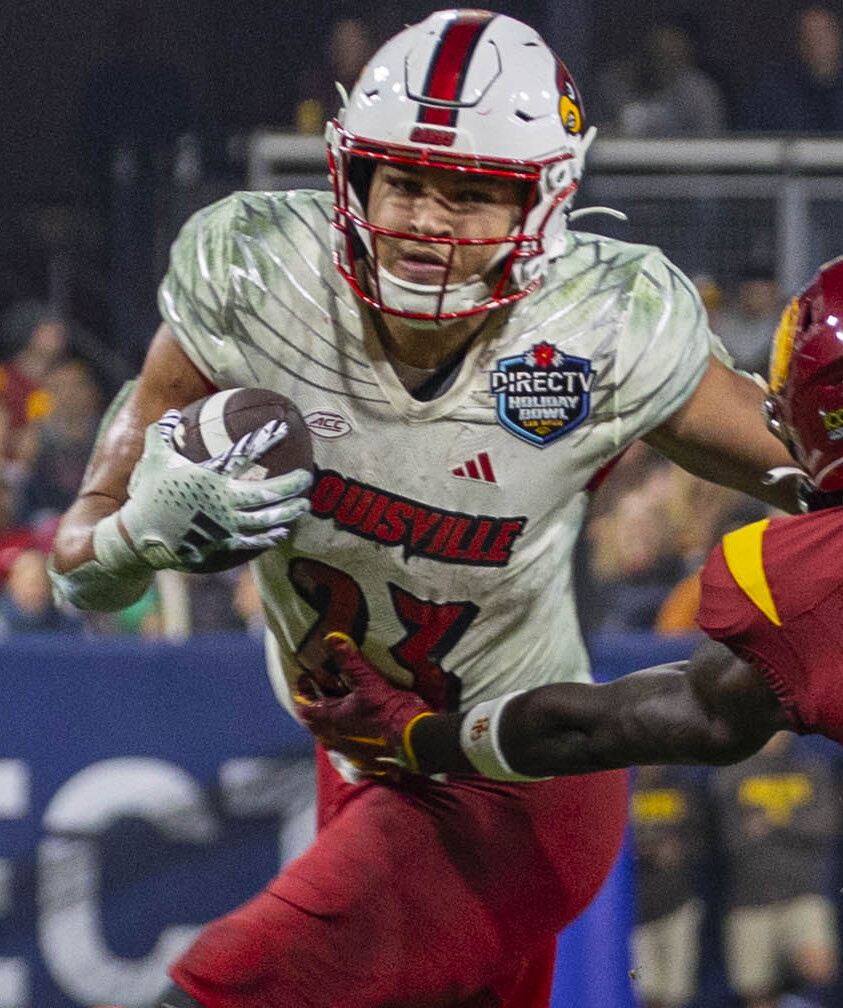
- Guerendo with the Louisville Cardinals in 2023

No. 31 – San Francisco 49ers
- Positions: Running back, kickoff returner
- Roster status: Physically unable to perform

Personal information
- Born: June 28, 2000 (age 26); Clayton, Indiana, U.S.
- Listed height: 6 ft 0 in (1.83 m)
- Listed weight: 221 lb (100 kg)

Career information
- High school: Avon (Avon, Indiana)
- College: Wisconsin (2019–2022); Louisville (2023)
- NFL draft: 2024: 4th round, 129th overall pick

Career history
- San Francisco 49ers (2024–present)

Career NFL statistics as of 2025
- Rushing attempts: 84
- Rushing yards: 420
- Rushing touchdowns: 4
- Receptions: 15
- Receiving yards: 152
- Return yards: 263
- Stats at Pro Football Reference

Isaac Guerendo (gwy-REN-doh; born June 28, 2000) is an American professional football running back and kickoff returner for the San Francisco 49ers of the National Football League (NFL). He played college football for the Wisconsin Badgers and Louisville Cardinals.

== Early life ==
Guerendo was born in Clayton, Indiana and attended Avon High School in Avon, Indiana. As a junior, he hauled in 19 receptions for 596 yards and six touchdowns. Guerendo had a breakout senior season, bringing in 54 receptions for 1,258 yards and 16 touchdowns. As a senior, he was named the Indianapolis Star's Mister Football for wide receivers.

Coming out of high school, Guerendo decided to commit to play college football for the Wisconsin Badgers.

== College career ==
=== Wisconsin ===
In Guerendo's first season in 2019, he carried the ball once for one yard, while also making one catch for three yards, and returning one kickoff for 49 yards.

During the COVID shortened 2020 season, Guerendo carried the ball 11 times for 36 yards.

In Week 2 of the 2021 season, Guerendo recorded his first career touchdown on an 82-yard run versus Eastern Michigan. He finished the season with 160 yards and a touchdown of 23 carries, while also racking up two receptions for six yards.

In 2022, Guerendo rushed for 385 yards and five touchdowns on 64 carries, while also notching 17 receptions for 115 yards and a touchdown. At the end of the season, Guerendo decided to enter the NCAA transfer portal.

Guerendo finished his Wisconsin Badger career playing in 20 games carrying the ball 99 times for 582 yards and six touchdowns, while also notching 20 receptions for 124 yards and a touchdown. He graduated from Wisconsin in December 2022 with a bachelor's degree in personal finance.

=== Louisville ===
In 2023, Guerendo became a graduate transfer to the University of Louisville, playing for the Louisville Cardinals for his final season of college eligibility. In his Louisville home debut in Week 2 of the 2023 season, Guerendo rushed for 63 yards and a touchdown on 11 carries, while also hauling in four receptions for 47 yards. In Week 10, he had a career performance rushing for 146 yards and three touchdowns in a win over Virginia Tech. In the 2023 Holiday Bowl, Guerendo rushed for a career high 161 yards and three touchdowns, on 23 carries, but the Cardinals lost to USC 42–28.

Guerendo finished the 2023 season with 810 yards and 11 touchdowns on 132 carries, while also making 22 receptions for 234 yards. After the season, he declared for the 2024 NFL draft.

== Professional career ==
Pre-draft measurables
Height	Weight	Arm length	Hand span	Wingspan	40-yard dash	10-yard split	20-yard split	20-yard shuttle	Three-cone drill	Vertical jump	Broad jump	Bench press
6 ft 0 in (1.83 m)	221 lb (100 kg)	30 3/4 in (0.78 m)	9 1/4 in (0.23 m)	6 ft 2 7/8 in (1.90 m)	4.33 s	1.55 s	2.54 s	4.15 s	6.94 s	41.5 in (1.05 m)	10 ft 9 in (3.28 m)	17 reps
All values from NFL Combine/Pro Day

Guerendo was drafted by the San Francisco 49ers in the fourth round (129th overall) of the 2024 NFL draft. In May, he signed his four-year rookie contract with the 49ers. After injuries to running backs Christian McCaffrey and Jordan Mason, Guerendo had some playing time, making his debut in the Week 2 23–17 road loss the Minnesota Vikings. He scored his first NFL touchdown on a four-yard rush during the Week 8 30–24 victory over the Dallas Cowboys, along with 102 scrimmage yards.

== NFL career statistics ==
Legend
**Bold**	Career high

=== Regular season ===
Year	Team	Games		Rushing					Receiving					Kick returns					Fumbles	
Year	Team	GP	GS	Att	Yds	Y/A	Lng	TD	Rec	Yds	Avg	Lng	TD	Ret	Yds	Avg	Lng	TD	Fum	Lost
2024	SF	**16**	**3**	84	420	5.0	76	4	15	152	10.1	40	0	**6**	**163**	**27.2**	**35**	0	**3**	**1**
2025	SF	14	0	–	–	–	–	–	–	–	–	–	–	5	100	20.0	25	0	0	0
Career		30	3	84	420	5.0	76	4	15	152	10.1	40	0	11	263	23.9	35	0	3	1

== Personal life ==
Guerendo was born in Indianapolis to Mario and Jennifer Guerendo. Mario is an immigrant from the Central African Republic, and Jen competed in track & field in high school.
