= Rock Ya-Sin =

American football player (born 1996)

No. 23 – Detroit Lions
- Position: Cornerback
- Roster status: Active

Personal information
- Born: May 23, 1996 (age 30); Decatur, Georgia, U.S.
- Listed height: 5 ft 11 in (1.80 m)
- Listed weight: 195 lb (88 kg)

Career information
- High school: Southwest DeKalb (Decatur)
- College: Presbyterian (2015–2017); Temple (2018)
- NFL draft: 2019: 2nd round, 34th overall pick

Career history
- Indianapolis Colts (2019–2021); Las Vegas Raiders (2022); Baltimore Ravens (2023); San Francisco 49ers (2024); Detroit Lions (2025–present)

Awards and highlights
- PFF All-Rookie Team (2019); First-team All-AAC (2018); First-team All-Big South (2017)

Career NFL statistics as of 2025
- Total tackles: 246
- Forced fumbles: 2
- Fumble recoveries: 2
- Pass deflections: 40
- Interceptions: 2
- Stats at Pro Football Reference

Abdurrahman "Rock" ibn Ramadan Ya-Sin (born May 23, 1996) is an American professional football cornerback for the Detroit Lions of the National Football League (NFL). He played college football for the Presbyterian Blue Hose, before transferring to the Temple Owls. He was selected by the Indianapolis Colts in the second round of the 2019 NFL draft.

== Early life ==
Ya-Sin attended Southwest DeKalb High School in Decatur, Georgia. He was ranked as a two-star recruit and committed to Presbyterian on February 5, 2015.

== College career ==
After Presbyterian decided to move to a non-scholarship conference in the Football Championship Subdivision, Ya-Sin transferred mid-year to Temple. After recording 44 tackles, two tackles-for-loss, two interceptions, and 12 pass breakups, Ya-Sin was selected to play in the 2019 Senior Bowl.

== Professional career ==
Pre-draft measurables
Height	Weight	Arm length	Hand span	Wingspan	40-yard dash	10-yard split	20-yard split	20-yard shuttle	Three-cone drill	Vertical jump	Broad jump	Bench press
5 ft 11 3/4 in (1.82 m)	192 lb (87 kg)	32 in (0.81 m)	9 7/8 in (0.25 m)	6 ft 5 3/8 in (1.97 m)	4.51 s	1.50 s	2.65 s	4.18 s	6.97 s	39.5 in (1.00 m)	10 ft 0 in (3.05 m)	18 reps
All values from NFL Combine/Pro Day

=== Indianapolis Colts ===
==== 2019 season ====
Ya-Sin was drafted by the Indianapolis Colts in the second round with the 34th overall pick in the 2019 NFL draft. In Week 11 against the Jacksonville Jaguars, Ya-Sin recorded his first career interception off a pass thrown by Nick Foles in the 33–13 win. Ya-Sin was named to Pro Football Focus' All-Rookie Team.

==== 2020 season ====
Ya-Sin switched his jersey number to 26 before the season, stating he wanted "a new beginning". He was inactive against the Minnesota Vikings in week 2 due to a stomach illness.

In Week 11 against the Green Bay Packers, Ya-Sin recorded his first interception of the season off a pass thrown by Aaron Rodgers during the 34–31 overtime win.

=== Las Vegas Raiders ===
On March 16, 2022, Ya-Sin was traded to the Las Vegas Raiders in exchange for Yannick Ngakoue. He played in 11 games with nine starts, recording 45 tackles and seven passes defensed.

=== Baltimore Ravens ===
On May 3, 2023, Ya-Sin signed a one-year, $6 million contract with the Baltimore Ravens. Ya-Sin made 14 appearances (including one start) for the Ravens, recording two pass deflections and 13 combined tackles.

=== San Francisco 49ers ===
On April 11, 2024, Ya-Sin signed a one-year contract with the San Francisco 49ers. Ya-Sin made 13 appearances for San Francisco, compiling two pass deflections and three combined tackles.

=== Detroit Lions ===
On March 20, 2025, Ya-Sin signed with the Detroit Lions. He played in all 17 games with six starts as the Lions third cornerback, recording 47 tackles and nine passes defensed.

On March 16, 2026, Ya-Sin re-signed with the Lions on a one-year, $4 million contract.

== NFL career statistics ==
Legend
	Led the league
**Bold**	Career high

=== Regular season ===
Year	Team	Games		Tackles					Fumbles			Interceptions					
Year	Team	GP	GS	Comb	Solo	Ast	Sack	TFL	FF	FR	Yds	Int	Yds	Avg	Lng	TD	PD
2019	IND	15	13	**62**	**54**	8	0.0	**2**	0	**1**	0	**1**	0	0.0	0	0	5
2020	IND	13	8	45	36	9	0.0	0	**1**	0	0	**1**	0	0.0	0	0	7
2021	IND	13	8	31	27	4	0.0	0	**1**	**1**	**13**	0	0	0.0	0	0	8
2022	LVR	11	9	45	37	8	0.0	0	0	0	0	0	0	0.0	0	0	7
2023	BAL	14	1	13	9	4	0.0	0	0	0	0	0	0	0.0	0	0	2
2024	SFO	13	0	3	3	0	0.0	0	0	0	0	0	0	0.0	0	0	2
2025	DET	17	6	47	27	**20**	0.0	0	0	0	0	0	0	0.0	0	0	**9**
Career		96	45	246	193	53	0.0	2	2	2	13	2	0	0.0	0	0	40

=== Playoffs ===
Year	Team	Games		Tackles					Fumbles			Interceptions					
Year	Team	GP	GS	Comb	Solo	Ast	Sack	TFL	FF	FR	Yds	Int	Yds	Avg	Lng	TD	PD
2023	BAL	1	0	0	0	0	0.0	0	0	0	0	0	0	0.0	0	0	0
Career		1	0	0	0	0	0.0	0	0	0	0	0	0	0.0	0	0	0
