= Tatum Bethune =

American football player (born 2001)

No. 48 – San Francisco 49ers
- Position: Linebacker
- Roster status: Active

Personal information
- Born: February 19, 2001 (age 25); Miami, Florida, U.S.
- Listed height: 6 ft 1 in (1.85 m)
- Listed weight: 230 lb (104 kg)

Career information
- High school: Miami Central Senior (FL)
- College: UCF (2019–2021); Florida State (2022–2023)
- NFL draft: 2024: 7th round, 251st overall pick

Career history
- San Francisco 49ers (2024–present)

Awards and highlights
- Third-team All-ACC (2023)

Career NFL statistics as of 2025
- Total tackles: 101
- Sacks: 1.0
- Fumble recoveries: 2
- Pass deflections: 4
- Stats at Pro Football Reference

Tatum Bethune (born February 19, 2001) is an American professional football linebacker for the San Francisco 49ers of the National Football League (NFL). He played college football for the UCF Knights and Florida State Seminoles. Bethune was drafted by the 49ers in the seventh round of the 2024 NFL draft.

== Early life ==
Bethune was born on February 19, 2001, in Miami, Florida. His great-great-great aunt is Mary McLeod Bethune, the founder of Bethune-Cookman College. Bethune attended Miami Central Senior High School. He was rated as a three-star recruit and committed to play for the UCF Knights.

== College career ==
=== UCF ===
In Bethune's first two seasons in 2019 and 2020, he recorded 77 tackles with 7.5 being for a loss, 2.5 sacks, three pass deflections, an interception, and a forced fumble. During the 2021 season, Bethune had 108 tackles with 5.5 being for a loss, two sacks, and two interceptions. After the end of the 2021 season, Bethune decided to enter the NCAA transfer portal.

During Bethune's career with UCF, he played in 35 games with 17 starts as he recorded 185 tackles with 13 being for a loss, 4.5 sacks, three interceptions, and two forced fumbles.

=== Florida State ===
Bethune decided to transfer to play for the Florida State Seminoles. Before the start of the 2022 season, Bethune underwent surgery on his groin. During Week 6 of the 2022 season, Bethune had 14 tackles with 2.5 being for a loss. He finished the 2022 season starting in 11 games where he made 84 tackles with 9.5 for a loss, three sacks, three pass deflections, and a fumble recovery.

During the 2023 season-opener, Bethune had nine tackles and a massive hit on LSU quarterback Jayden Daniels, as he helped the Seminoles to a win over LSU. During the 2023 season, Bethune recorded 70 tackles with 5.5 being for a loss, three pass deflections, and an interception. For this performance he was named third team all-ACC. After the conclusion of the 2023 season, Bethune decided to declare for the 2024 NFL draft.

== Professional career ==
Pre-draft measurables
Height	Weight	Arm length	Hand span	Wingspan	40-yard dash	10-yard split	20-yard split	20-yard shuttle	Three-cone drill	Vertical jump	Broad jump	Bench press
5 ft 11 1/2 in (1.82 m)	229 lb (104 kg)	32 3/8 in (0.82 m)	10 in (0.25 m)	6 ft 6 1/4 in (1.99 m)	4.77 s	1.63 s	2.75 s	4.35 s	7.03 s	30.5 in (0.77 m)	9 ft 7 in (2.92 m)	19 reps
All values from NFL Combine/Pro Day

=== 2024 season ===
Bethune was selected in the seventh round (251st overall) of the 2024 NFL draft by the San Francisco 49ers.

Bethune made his NFL debut in the season-opener against the New York Jets on Monday Night Football, but recorded no statistics during the 32–19 victory. During a Week 6 36–24 road victory over the Seattle Seahawks on Thursday Night Football, Bethune recorded a tackle and a fumble recovery. On November 23, he was placed on injured reserve with a knee injury.

On December 30, Bethune was activated from injured reserve. That same day against the Detroit Lions on Monday Night Football, he had two combined tackles (one solo) and a fumble recovery in the 40–34 loss. In the regular season finale against the Arizona Cardinals, Bethune recorded a season-high three tackles during the 47–24 road loss.

Bethune finished his rookie year with seven combined tackles (one solo), 0.5 sacks, and two fumble recoveries in 11 games and one start.

=== 2025 season ===
Bethune entered the season as a backup linebacker, but was thrust into a starter role after Fred Warner suffered an injury in Week 6 against the Tampa Bay Buccaneers. Bethune finished the 30–19 road loss with a team-high 10 combined tackles (five solo). During Week 8 against the Atlanta Falcons on Sunday Night Football, Bethune once again had a team-high 10 combined tackles (four solo) in the 20–10 victory.

During Week 8 against the Houston Texans, Bethune recorded a team-high 14 combined tackles (four solo) in the 26–15 road loss. In the next game against the New York Giants, he had a season-high 16 combined tackles (eight solo) and a pass deflection during the 34–24 road victory. The following week against the Los Angeles Rams, Bethune recorded a team-high 10 combined tackles (two solo) in the 42–26 loss.

During a Week 16 48–27 road victory over the Indianapolis Colts on Monday Night Football, Bethune had a team-high nine combined tackles (four solo) and a pass deflection. In the next game against the Chicago Bears on Sunday Night Football, he recorded a team-high 11 tackles (seven solo) and a pass deflection during the 42–38 victory. During the regular-season finale against the Seahawks, Bethune had seven combined tackles (two solo) and his first NFL sack on Sam Darnold before leaving the eventual 13–3 loss in the fourth quarter with a torn groin muscle. On January 7, 2026, he was placed on injured reserve.

Bethune finished his second professional season with 94 combined tackles (39 solo), four pass deflections, and a sack in 14 games and eight starts.

== NFL career statistics ==
Legend
**Bold**	Career high

=== Regular season ===
Year	Team	Games		Tackles					Interceptions						Fumbles			
Year	Team	GP	GS	Cmb	Solo	Ast	Sck	TFL	PD	Int	Yds	Avg	Lng	TD	FF	FR	Yds	TD
2024	SF	11	1	7	1	6	0.0	0	0	0	0	0.0	0	0	0	**2**	0	0
2025	SF	**14**	**8**	**94**	**39**	**55**	**1.0**	**4**	**4**	0	0	0.0	0	0	0	0	0	0
Career		25	9	101	40	61	1.0	4	4	0	0	0.0	0	0	0	2	0	0
