= Jaylen Mahoney =

American football player (born 2000)

Profile
- Position: Safety

Personal information
- Born: November 19, 2000 (age 25); Rock Hill, South Carolina, U.S.
- Listed height: 5 ft 11 in (1.80 m)
- Listed weight: 188 lb (85 kg)

Career information
- High school: South Pointe (Rock Hill, South Carolina)
- College: Vanderbilt (2019–2023)
- NFL draft: 2024: undrafted

Career history
- San Francisco 49ers (2024–2025); New York Jets (2025)*; Orlando Storm (2026); Philadelphia Eagles (2026)*
- * Offseason or practice squad member only

Career NFL statistics as of 2024
- Total tackles: 3
- Stats at Pro Football Reference

Jaylen Elijah Mahoney (born November 19, 2000) is an American professional football safety. He played college football for the Vanderbilt Commodores.

== College career ==
During Mahoney's five-year collegiate career from 2019 to 2023, he appeared in 54 games, where he notched 247 tackles with 17 being for a loss, four sacks, 18 pass deflections, four interceptions, a forced fumble, and four fumble recoveries.

== Professional career ==
Pre-draft measurables
Height	Weight	Arm length	Hand span	Wingspan	40-yard dash	10-yard split	20-yard split	20-yard shuttle	Three-cone drill	Vertical jump	Broad jump	Bench press
5 ft 10 5/8 in (1.79 m)	188 lb (85 kg)	31 7/8 in (0.81 m)	8 5/8 in (0.22 m)	6 ft 3 1/8 in (1.91 m)	4.54 s	1.57 s	2.46 s	4.31 s	7.03 s	33.5 in (0.85 m)	10 ft 0 in (3.05 m)	19 reps
All values from Pro Day

=== San Francisco 49ers ===
After not being selected in the 2024 NFL draft, Mahoney signed with the San Francisco 49ers as an undrafted free agent. On August 27, 2024, Mahoney was released during final roster cuts but signed to the team's practice squad the following day. On September 28, Mahoney was elevated to the team's active roster ahead of their week four matchup versus the New England Patriots.

Mahoney signed a reserve/future contract with San Francisco on January 6, 2025. On July 31, Mahoney was waived by the 49ers. Four days later, Mahoney was re-signed by the 49ers. He was waived on August 26 as part of final roster cuts. On September 24, Mahoney signed with the 49ers' practice squad. On October 8, he was released by the 49ers.

=== New York Jets ===
On December 16, 2025, Mahoney was signed to the New York Jets' practice squad.

=== Orlando Storm ===
On January 14, 2026, Mahoney was selected by the Orlando Storm in the 2026 UFL Draft.

=== Philadelphia Eagles ===
On August 24, 2026, Mahoney was signed by the Philadelphia Eagles. He was waived by the Eagles as a part of final roster cuts on August 30.
