= Malik Mustapha =

American football player (born 2002)

No. 6 – San Francisco 49ers
- Position: Safety
- Roster status: Active

Personal information
- Born: June 25, 2002 (age 24); Charlotte, North Carolina, U.S.
- Listed height: 5 ft 10 in (1.78 m)
- Listed weight: 206 lb (93 kg)

Career information
- High school: Weddington (Weddington, North Carolina)
- College: Richmond (2020); Wake Forest (2021–2023)
- NFL draft: 2024: 4th round, 124th overall pick

Career history
- San Francisco 49ers (2024–present)

Awards and highlights
- Second-team All-ACC (2023)

Career NFL statistics as of Week 10, 2026
- Total tackles: 181
- Fumble recoveries: 1
- Pass deflections: 14
- Interceptions: 4
- Stats at Pro Football Reference

Abdul Malik Mustapha (born June 25, 2002) is an American professional football safety for the San Francisco 49ers of the National Football League (NFL). He played college football for the Richmond Spiders and Wake Forest Demon Deacons. Mustapha was selected by the 49ers in the fourth round of the 2024 NFL draft.

== Early life ==
Mustapha is of Nigerian descent. He attended Weddington High School in Weddington, North Carolina. As a senior, Mustapha had 68 tackles and five interceptions, including a North Carolina state title where he blocked a kick in the second half of the championship game. Mustapha committed to the University of Richmond to play college football.

== College career ==
Mustapha played at Richmond for one year before transferring to Wake Forest University. He played at Wake Forest from 2021 to 2023. During his career, Mustapha had 175 tackles, three interceptions, and four sacks over 35 games. He elected to forgo his senior season and enter the 2024 NFL draft.

== Professional career ==
Pre-draft measurables
Height	Weight	Arm length	Hand span	Wingspan	40-yard dash	10-yard split	20-yard split	Vertical jump	Broad jump	Bench press
5 ft 10 1/8 in (1.78 m)	209 lb (95 kg)	30 1/8 in (0.77 m)	9 in (0.23 m)	6 ft 0 1/2 in (1.84 m)	4.54 s	1.58 s	2.57 s	41.5 in (1.05 m)	10 ft 6 in (3.20 m)	22 reps
All values from NFL Combine/Pro Day

=== 2024 ===
The San Francisco 49ers selected Mustapha in the fourth round (124th overall) of the 2024 NFL draft. The pick had initially belonged to the Dallas Cowboys, who traded it to the 49ers in exchange for Trey Lance.

Mustapha began his rookie year as a backup, but injuries sustained by Talanoa Hufanga soon thrust him into a more prominent role. During Week 4, Mustapha made his first start in a 30–13 victory over the New England Patriots. He recorded his first career interception two weeks later during a Thursday night game against the Seattle Seahawks; the 49ers defeated the Seahawks 36–24. Owing to his strong play, Mustapha was able to retain his position as a starter following Hufanga's return to the lineup in Week 14.

Mustapha finished the season with 72 total tackles, including two tackles for loss, five pass deflections, and an interception.

=== 2025 ===
On April 26, 2025, it was reported that Mustapha has reaggravated an old ACL injury during Week 18 of the 2024 season, and would miss the beginning of the 2025 season. On October 11, Mustapha was activated from the PUP list.

== NFL career statistics ==
Legend
**Bold**	Career high

=== Regular season ===
Year	Team	Games		Tackles					Interceptions						Fumbles			
Year	Team	GP	GS	Cmb	Solo	Ast	Sck	TFL	Int	Yds	Avg	Lng	TD	PD	FF	FR	Yds	TD
2024	SF	**16**	**12**	72	32	**40**	0.0	2	1	**1**	**1.0**	**1**	0	5	0	0	0	0
2025	SF	12	10	**76**	**44**	32	0.0	**3**	1	0	0.0	0	0	3	0	0	0	0
2025	SF	9	5	33	20	13	0.0	0	**2**	0	0.0	0	0	**6**	0	**1**	**1**	0
Career		37	27	181	96	85	0.0	5	4	1	0.3	1	0	14	0	1	1	0

=== Postseason ===
Year	Team	Games		Tackles					Interceptions						Fumbles			
Year	Team	GP	GS	Cmb	Solo	Ast	Sck	TFL	Int	Yds	Avg	Lng	TD	PD	FF	FR	Yds	TD
2025	SF	2	2	11	8	3	1.0	1	0	0	0.0	0	0	0	0	0	0	0
Career		2	2	11	8	3	1.0	1	0	0	0.0	0	0	0	0	0	0	0
