= Evan Anderson =

American football player (born 2002)

Profile
- Position: Defensive tackle

Personal information
- Born: February 14, 2002 (age 24); Orlando, Florida, U.S.
- Listed height: 6 ft 3 in (1.91 m)
- Listed weight: 326 lb (148 kg)

Career information
- High school: Jones (Orlando)
- College: Florida Atlantic (2020–2023)
- NFL draft: 2024: undrafted

Career history
- San Francisco 49ers (2024–2025)

Awards and highlights
- Second-team All-CUSA (2022); Third-team All-AAC (2023)

Career NFL statistics as of 2024
- Total tackles: 24
- Sacks: 1
- Forced fumbles: 1
- Fumble recoveries: 1
- Stats at Pro Football Reference

Evan Anderson (born February 14, 2002) is an American professional football defensive tackle. He played college football for the Florida Atlantic Owls.

== College career ==
During Anderson's four-year career from 2020 to 2023, he played in 39 games, where he notched 146 tackles with 21 being for a loss, seven sacks, two pass deflections, and three fumble recoveries.

== Professional career ==
Pre-draft measurables
Height	Weight	Arm length	Hand span	Wingspan	40-yard dash	10-yard split	20-yard split	20-yard shuttle	Three-cone drill	Vertical jump	Broad jump	Bench press
6 ft 1 1/8 in (1.86 m)	320 lb (145 kg)	32 3/8 in (0.82 m)	9 1/4 in (0.23 m)	6 ft 6 1/2 in (1.99 m)	5.35 s	1.77 s	2.98 s	4.99 s	8.20 s	30 in (0.76 m)	8 ft 3 in (2.51 m)	31 reps
All values from Pro Day

After not being selected in the 2024 NFL draft, Anderson signed with the San Francisco 49ers as an undrafted free agent. He was also selected by the Memphis Showboats in the third round of the 2024 UFL draft on July 17. However, on August 27, 2024, Anderson was released but signed to the team's practice squad the following day. On September 28, Anderson was elevated to the team's active roster ahead of their week four matchup versus the New England Patriots. On October 23, Anderson was promoted to the active roster.

On April 22, 2025, Anderson re-signed with the 49ers. He was waived on August 27 and re-signed to the practice squad the next day. On January 20, 2026, Anderson signed a reserve/futures contract with San Francisco.

On July 25, 2026, Anderson was waived by the 49ers and re-signed on August 18. On August 30, he was waived by San Francisco as a part of final roster cuts.
