= Josh Williams (American football executive) =

American football executive (born 1987)

San Francisco 49ers
- Title: Director of Scouting & Football Operations

Personal information
- Born: May 16, 1987 (age 39); San Francisco, California, U.S.

Career information
- Position: Wide receiver (No. 9)
- High school: St. Ignatius College Preparatory
- College: Columbia (2006–2009)

Career history
- San Francisco 49ers (2011–2012) Scouting assistant; San Francisco 49ers (2013–2015) Pro scout; San Francisco 49ers (2016) National football scouting representative; San Francisco 49ers (2017–2021) Area scout; San Francisco 49ers (2022–2023) National scout; San Francisco 49ers (2024–present) Director of scouting & football operations

Joshua Armoni Williams (born May 16, 1987) is an American professional football executive who is the director of scouting and football operations for the San Francisco 49ers of the National Football League (NFL). He has served in various scouting and executive roles for the 49ers since 2011.

== Early life ==
A native of San Francisco, California, Williams attended and played college football at Columbia University as a wide receiver from 2006 to 2009. He earned his degree in psychology from the Columbia University in 2010.

== Executive career ==
=== San Francisco 49ers ===
In 2011, Williams began his NFL career as a scouting assistant for the San Francisco 49ers under general manager Trent Baalke. In 2013, Williams was promoted to a pro scout. In 2016, Williams served as the 49ers' National Pro Scouting Representative. In 2017, Williams was retained under new general manager, John Lynch and was promoted to area scout. In 2022, Williams was promoted to a national scout. In 2024, Williams was promoted to the director of scouting and football operations. During the 2024 season, Williams participated in the National Football League's Front Office and General Manager Accelerator Program.

Williams interviewed for the Atlanta Falcons head football executive job in 2026.
