= Renardo Green =

American football player (born 2000)

No. 0 – San Francisco 49ers
- Position: Cornerback
- Roster status: Active

Personal information
- Born: November 9, 2000 (age 26); Orlando, Florida, U.S.
- Listed height: 6 ft 0 in (1.83 m)
- Listed weight: 186 lb (84 kg)

Career information
- High school: Wekiva (Apopka, Florida)
- College: Florida State (2019–2023)
- NFL draft: 2024: 2nd round, 64th overall pick

Career history
- San Francisco 49ers (2024–present)

Awards and highlights
- Second-team All-ACC (2023)

Career NFL statistics as of Week 10, 2026
- Total tackles: 158
- Forced fumbles: 1
- Pass deflections: 30
- Interceptions: 5
- Stats at Pro Football Reference

Renardo Green (born November 9, 2000) is an American professional football cornerback for the San Francisco 49ers of the National Football League (NFL). He played college football for the Florida State Seminoles and was selected by the 49ers in the second round of the 2024 NFL draft.

== Early life ==
Green attended Wekiva High School in Apopka, Florida. As a senior, he had 25 tackles and four interceptions. Green committed to Florida State University to play college football.

== College career ==
Green played at Florida State from 2019 to 2023 as a cornerback and safety. During his career, Green played in 53 games and recorded 148 tackles and an interception. He opted out of the 2023 Orange Bowl and entered the 2024 NFL draft.

== Professional career ==
Pre-draft measurables
Height	Weight	Arm length	Hand span	Wingspan	40-yard dash	10-yard split	20-yard split	20-yard shuttle	Vertical jump	Broad jump
5 ft 11 7/8 in (1.83 m)	186 lb (84 kg)	31 1/4 in (0.79 m)	9 1/8 in (0.23 m)	6 ft 2 3/4 in (1.90 m)	4.49 s	1.53 s	2.62 s	4.28 s	37.5 in (0.95 m)	10 ft 10 in (3.30 m)
All values from NFL Combine/Pro Day

=== 2024 season ===
Green was selected by the San Francisco 49ers in the second round (64th overall) of the 2024 NFL draft. In Week 6, against the Seattle Seahawks, Green had his first interception, which he returned for 20 yards in the 36–24 victory.

Green finished his rookie year with 61 combined tackles (41 solo), 13 pass deflections, a forced fumble, and an interception in 17 games and starts.

=== 2025 season ===
Green finished his second professional season with 60 combined tackles (36 solo) and 10 pass deflections in 14 games and starts.

== NFL career statistics ==
Legend
**Bold**	Career high

=== Regular season ===
Year	Team	Games		Tackles					Interceptions						Fumbles			
Year	Team	GP	GS	Cmb	Solo	Ast	Sck	TFL	Int	Yds	Avg	Lng	TD	PD	FF	FR	Yds	TD
2024	SF	**17**	7	**61**	**41**	20	0.0	0	1	**20**	**20.0**	**20**	0	**13**	**1**	0	0	0
2025	SF	14	**14**	60	36	**24**	0.0	0	0	0	0.0	0	0	10	0	0	0	0
2026	SF	9	9	37	25	12	0.0	0	**4**	2	0.5	2	0	7	0	0	0	0
Career		40	30	158	102	56	0.0	0	5	22	4.4	20	0	30	1	0	0	0

=== Postseason ===
Year	Team	Games		Tackles					Interceptions						Fumbles			
Year	Team	GP	GS	Cmb	Solo	Ast	Sck	TFL	Int	Yds	Avg	Lng	TD	PD	FF	FR	Yds	TD
2025	SF	2	2	6	5	1	0.0	0	0	0	0.0	0	0	0	0	0	0	0
Career		2	2	6	5	1	0.0	0	0	0	0.0	0	0	0	0	0	0	0
