= 2025 San Francisco 49ers season =

76th season in franchise history

- Owner: Jed York
- General manager: John Lynch
- Head coach: Kyle Shanahan
- Offensive coordinator: Klay Kubiak
- Defensive coordinator: Robert Saleh
- Home stadium: Levi's Stadium

Results
- Record: 12–5
- Division place: 3rd NFC West
- Playoffs: Won Wild Card Playoffs (at Eagles) 23–19; Lost Divisional Playoffs (at Seahawks) 6–41
- All-Pros: FB Kyle Juszczyk (1st team); RB Christian McCaffrey (1st team); OT Trent Williams (2nd team)
- Pro Bowlers: OT Trent Williams; FB Kyle Juszczyk; TE George Kittle; RB Christian McCaffrey; LS Jon Weeks; ST Luke Gifford

Uniform
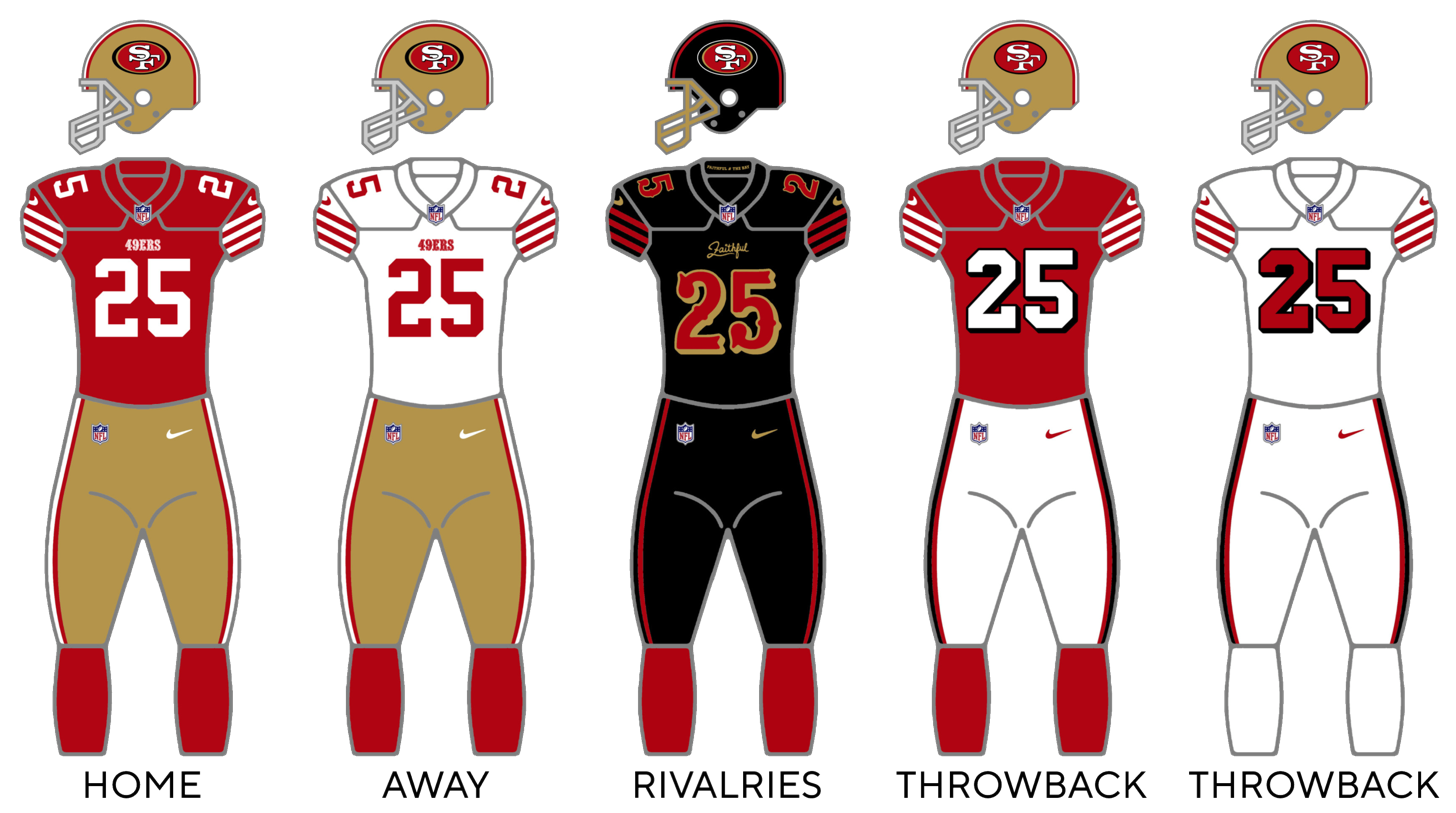

The 2025 season was the San Francisco 49ers' 76th in the National Football League (NFL), their 80th overall, their 12th playing their home games at Levi's Stadium, and their ninth under the head coach/general manager tandem of Kyle Shanahan and John Lynch. The 49ers improved on their 6–11 record from 2024 following a Week 11 victory against the division rival Arizona Cardinals and clinched a return to the playoffs after a one-year absence when the Detroit Lions lost to the Pittsburgh Steelers in Week 16. The team clinched their fourth winning season in five years after a Week 13 win against the Cleveland Browns. For the first time since reaching the Super Bowl LIV in the 2019 season, Brandon Aiyuk was not on the 49ers' roster, as he missed the whole season.

This season marked the return of Robert Saleh as defensive coordinator, replacing Nick Sorensen, who was fired by the team after a single season. Saleh had previously coordinated the 49ers' defense from 2017 to 2020, after which he spent three full seasons as the head coach of the New York Jets before being relieved of his position just five games into the 2024 season.

The 2025 offseason saw a number of significant departures in free agency, among them linebacker Dre Greenlaw, guard Aaron Banks, safety Talanoa Hufanga, and cornerback Charvarius Ward. Additionally, the 49ers traded wide receiver Deebo Samuel to the Washington Commanders. This was the team's first season since 2018 without either Samuel or Greenlaw on its roster.

The 49ers entered the playoffs as a Wild Card team for the first time since 2021. They opened their playoff run by pulling off an upset and defeating the defending champion Philadelphia Eagles in the Wild Card Round. They then faced the division rival and top-seeded Seattle Seahawks in the Divisional Round, where their season ended with a 41–6 blowout loss to the eventual Super Bowl champions, their second-most lopsided playoff defeat in franchise history behind only their 49–3 loss to the New York Giants during the 1986 NFC Divisional Round.

At the end of the season running back Christian McCaffrey won the AP Comeback Player of the Year award as he finished sixth in the league with 102 receptions for 924 yards to go with 1,202 rushing yards and 17 total touchdowns (10 rushing and 7 receiving). This was after he was limited to just four games the previous season. Head coach Kyle Shanahan was also nominated for AP NFL Coach of the Year for leading the 49ers to 12 wins and a playoff berth despite the team finishing with the 3rd most man games lost to injuries, but Patriots head coach Mike Vrabel ultimately won the award.

The San Francisco 49ers drew an average home attendance of 71,422, the 9th-highest of all NFL teams.

== Offseason ==
=== Roster changes ===
Free agency: The 49ers entered free agency with the following:

Position	Player	Free agency tag	Date signed	2025 team	Notes
CB	Charvarius Ward	UFA	March 12, 2025	Indianapolis Colts	Signed three-year contract
LB	Dre Greenlaw	UFA	March 13, 2025	Denver Broncos	Signed three-year contract
LB	De'Vondre Campbell	UFA			
QB	Joshua Dobbs	UFA	March 18, 2025	New England Patriots	Terms undisclosed
DT	Kevin Givens	UFA	March 11, 2025	San Francisco 49ers	Signed one-year contract
QB	Brandon Allen	UFA	March 14, 2025	Tennessee Titans	Signed one-year contract
LB	Demetrius Flannigan-Fowles	UFA	March 14, 2025	New York Giants	Terms undisclosed
CB	Isaac Yiadom	UFA	March 13, 2025	New Orleans Saints	Signed three-year contract
G	Aaron Banks	UFA	March 18, 2025	Green Bay Packers	Signed four-year contract
DT	Khalil Davis	UFA			Retired
WR	Chris Conley	UFA			Retired
TE	Eric Saubert	UFA	March 24, 2025	Seattle Seahawks	Terms undisclosed
CB	Rock Ya-Sin	UFA	March 20, 2025	Detroit Lions	Terms undisclosed
G	Ben Bartch	UFA	February 24, 2025	San Francisco 49ers	Signed one-year contract
OT	Jaylon Moore	UFA	March 13, 2025	Kansas City Chiefs	Signed two-year-contract
S	Talanoa Hufanga	UFA	March 13, 2025	Denver Broncos	Signed three-year contract
RB	Elijah Mitchell	UFA	March 13, 2025	Kansas City Chiefs	Signed one-year contract
RB	Patrick Taylor	UFA	March 21, 2025	San Francisco 49ers	Signed one-year contract
OT	Charlie Heck	UFA	March 17, 2025	Tampa Bay Buccaneers	Signed one-year contract
CB	Nick McCloud	UFA	March 24, 2025	Chicago Bears	Signed one-year contract
S	Tashaun Gipson	UFA			
P	Pat O'Donnell	UFA			
TE	Jake Tonges	ERFA	April 17, 2025	San Francisco 49ers	Signed one-year contract
TE	Brayden Willis	ERFA	April 22, 2025	San Francisco 49ers	Signed one-year contract
G	Austen Pleasants	ERFA	April 17, 2025	San Francisco 49ers	Signed one-year contract
DT	Evan Anderson	ERFA	April 22, 2025	San Francisco 49ers	Signed one-year contract
DE	Alex Barrett	ERFA	April 22, 2025	San Francisco 49ers	Signed one-year contract
DE	Sam Okuayinonu	ERFA	March 26, 2025	San Francisco 49ers	Signed one-year contract
LB	Jalen Graham	ERFA	April 22, 2025	San Francisco 49ers	Signed one-year contract
RB	Jordan Mason	RFA	March 18, 2025	Minnesota Vikings	Traded
LB	Curtis Robinson	RFA	March 12, 2025	San Francisco 49ers	Signed one-year contract
RFA: Restricted free agent, UFA: Unrestricted free agent, ERFA: Exclusive rights free agent Legend – Light green background indicates a player has been re-signed by the 49ers. – Light red background indicates a player has departed the 49ers.

==== Signings ====
Position	Player	2024 team	Date signed	Notes
TE	Luke Farrell	Jacksonville Jaguars	March 13, 2025	Signed three-year contract
FS	Richie Grant	Atlanta Falcons	March 13, 2025	Signed one-year contract
WR	Demarcus Robinson	Los Angeles Rams	March 13, 2025	Signed two-year contract
CB	Tre Brown	Seattle Seahawks	March 13, 2025	Signed one-year contract
FS	Jason Pinnock	New York Giants	March 13, 2025	Signed one-year contract
LB	Luke Gifford	Tennessee Titans	March 13, 2025	Signed one-year contract
LS	Jon Weeks	Houston Texans	March 13, 2025	Signed one-year contract
QB	Mac Jones	Jacksonville Jaguars	March 14, 2025	Signed two-year contract
CB	Siran Neal	Miami Dolphins	March 18, 2025	Signed two-year contract
FB	Kyle Juszczyk	San Francisco 49ers	March 19, 2025	Signed two-year contract
TE	Ross Dwelley	Atlanta Falcons	May 2, 2025	Signed one-year contract
OT	Andre Dillard	Green Bay Packers	May 9, 2025	Signed one-year contract
CB	Dallis Flowers	Tampa Bay Buccaneers	May 9, 2025	Signed one-year contract
OT	Nicholas Petit-Frere	Tennessee Titans	May 9, 2025	Signed one-year contract
K	Greg Joseph		May 19, 2025	Signed one-year contract
P	Thomas Morstead		May 28, 2025	Signed one-year contract
LB	Chazz Surratt		May 28, 2025	Signed one-year contract
WR	Malik Knowles		June 3, 2025	Signed one-year contract
WR	Equanimeous St. Brown		July 22, 2025	Signed one-year contract
WR	Quintez Cephus		July 24, 2025	Signed one-year contract
CB	Eli Apple		July 28, 2025	Signed one-year contract
DE	Jaylon Allen		July 29, 2025	Signed one-year contract
WR	Marquez Callaway		July 31, 2025	Signed one-year contract
WR	Andy Isabella		July 31, 2025	Signed one-year contract
RB	Ameer Abdullah		July 31, 2025	Signed one-year contract
QB	Carter Bradley		July 31, 2025	Signed one-year contract
WR	Robbie Chosen		August 3, 2025	Signed one-year contract
DE	Bradlee Anae		August 4, 2025	Signed one-year contract
DT	Bruce Hector		August 4, 2025	Signed one-year contract
S	Jaylen Mahoney		August 4, 2025	Signed one-year contract
CB	Fabian Moreau		August 4, 2025	Signed one-year contract
OT	Isaiah Prince		August 4, 2025	Signed one-year contract
WR	Equanimeous St. Brown		August 5, 2025	Signed one-year contract
DT	Michael Dwumfour		August 7, 2025	Signed one-year contract
QB	Tanner Mordecai		August 8, 2025	Signed one-year contract
RB	Ke'Shawn Vaughn		August 9, 2025	Signed one-year contract
RB	Jeff Wilson	Miami Dolphins	August 11, 2025	Signed one-year contract
DE	Trevis Gipson	Seattle Seahawks	August 11, 2025	Signed one-year contract
WR	Malik Turner		August 13, 2025	Signed one-year contract
DE	Will Bradley-King		August 14, 2025	Signed one-year contract
DE	Demone Harris		August 14, 2025	Signed one-year contract
DE	Shakel Brown		August 15, 2025	Signed one-year contract
QB	Nate Sudfeld		August 19, 2025	Signed one-year contract
G	Michael Dunn		August 20, 2025	Signed one-year contract
WR	Malik Knowles		August 20, 2025	Signed one-year contract
QB	Tanner Mordecai		August 21, 2025	Signed one-year contract

Indicates that the player was a free agent at the end of his respective team's 2024 season.

==== Departures ====
Position	Player	Date	Notes
LB	Demetrius Flannigan-Fowles	February 18, 2025	Released
C	Jon Feliciano	February 24, 2025	Retired
FB	Kyle Juszczyk	March 11, 2025	Released
DT	Javon Hargrave	March 12, 2025	Released
DT	Maliek Collins	March 12, 2025	Released
WR	Deebo Samuel	March 12, 2025	Traded
LS	Taybor Pepper	March 13, 2025	Released
RB	Jordan Mason	March 18, 2025	Traded
DE	Drake Jackson	May 9, 2025	Waived
OT	Jalen McKenzie	May 9, 2025	Waived
CB	Tre Tomlinson	May 9, 2025	Waived
S	Quindell Johnson	May 13, 2025	Waived
DE	Alex Barrett	May 19, 2025	Waived
LB	DaShaun White	May 28, 2025	Waived
P	Mitch Wishnowsky	May 28, 2025	Released
OT	Nicholas Petit-Frere	June 3, 2025	Waived
S	George Odum	July 19, 2025	Released
RB	Israel Abanikanda	July 24, 2025	Waived
WR	Quintez Cephus	July 28, 2025	Released
WR	Equanimeous St. Brown	July 31, 2025	Released
WR	Malik Knowles	July 31, 2025	Waived
OT	Sebastian Gutierrez	July 31, 2025	Waived
S	Jaylen Mahoney	July 31, 2025	Waived
WR	Marquez Callaway	August 3, 2025	Released
K	Greg Joseph	August 4, 2025	Released
CB	Tre Avery	August 4, 2025	Waived
WR	Isaiah Neyor	August 4, 2025	Waived
QB	Tanner Mordecai	August 4, 2025	Waived
TE	Mason Pline	August 4, 2025	Waived
WR	Andy Isabella	August 5, 2025	Released
CB	Eli Apple	August 7, 2025	Released
G	Zack Johnson	August 9, 2025	Waived
QB	Tanner Mordecai	August 11, 2025	Waived
DT	Michael Dwumfour	August 14, 2025	Waived
TE	Ross Dwelley	August 15, 2025	Released
DE	Demone Harris	August 20, 2025	Released
WR	Corey Kiner	August 20, 2025	Waived
QB	Nate Sudfeld	August 21, 2025	Released
WR	Malik Knowles	August 24, 2025	Waived
DE	Jaylon Allen	August 25, 2025	Waived
DE	Shakel Brown	August 25, 2025	Waived
QB	Tanner Mordecai	August 25, 2025	Waived
QB	Carter Bradley	August 25, 2025	Waived
RB	Ke'Shawn Vaughn	August 25, 2025	Released

== Draft ==
2025 San Francisco 49ers draft selections
Round	Selection	Player	Position	College	Notes
1	11	Mykel Williams	DE	Georgia	
2	43	Alfred Collins	DT	Texas	
3	75	Nick Martin	LB	Oklahoma State	
3	100	Upton Stout	CB	Western Kentucky	2020 Resolution JC-2A selection (Note: The 49ers were awarded an additional third-round selection as compensation for the Houston Texans' hiring of former 49ers defensive coordinator DeMeco Ryans as head coach.)
4	113	CJ West	DT	Indiana	
4	138	Jordan Watkins	WR	Ole Miss	Compensatory selection
5	147	Jordan James	RB	Oregon	From Saints via Commanders (Note: The 49ers traded WR Deebo Samuel to the Washington Commanders in exchange for a fifth-round selection (147th overall).)
5	—	Selection forfeited (Note: The 49ers forfeited a fifth-round selection as punishment for administrative payroll accounting errors that occurred during the 2022 season.)			
5	160	Marques Sigle	S	Kansas State	From Vikings (Note: The 49ers traded a sixth-round selection (187th overall) and RB Jordan Mason to the Minnesota Vikings in exchange for a fifth-round selection (160th overall) and a 2026 sixth-round selection.)
6	187	Traded to the Minnesota Vikings			
7	227	Kurtis Rourke	QB	Indiana	
7	249	Connor Colby	G	Iowa	Compensatory selection
7	252	Junior Bergen	WR	Montana	Compensatory selection

2025 San Francisco 49ers undrafted free agents
Name	Position	College	Ref.
Corey Kiner	RB	Cincinnati	
Drew Moss	G	Colorado State	
Isaiah Neyor	WR	Nebraska	
Jakob Robinson	CB	BYU	
Sebastian Valdez	DT	Washington	
Stone Blanton	LB	Mississippi State	
Derrick Canteen	CB	Cincinnati	

Draft trades

== Staff ==
2025 San Francisco 49ers staff
Front office: Co-chairmen – John and Denise DeBartolo York; Chief executive officer – Jed York; President – Al Guido; President of football operations/general manager – John Lynch; President of 49ers enterprises and EVP of football operations – Paraag Marathe; Vice president and senior advisor – Keena Turner; Assistant general manager – Brian Hampton; Assistant general manager - RJ Gillen; Vice president of player personnel – Tariq Ahmad; Director of scouting and football operations – Josh Williams; Director of college scouting – Dominic DeCicco; Associate director of college scouting – Justin Chabot; Director of pro scouting – Fred Gammage III; Vice president of football R&D – Matt Ploenzke, PhD; Manager, Football R&D - Shavran Ramruthy; Senior personnel advisor – Frank Gore; Personnel executive – Ethan Waugh; Head coaches: Head coach – Kyle Shanahan; Assistant head coach/defense – Gus Bradley; Assistant head coach/offensive line – Chris Foerster; Offensive coaches: Offensive coordinator – Klay Kubiak; Quarterbacks – Mick Lombardi; Running backs – Robert Turner Jr; Wide receivers/passing game specialist – Leonard Hankerson; Run game coordinator/tight ends – Brian Fleury; Assistant offensive line – Cameron Clemmons; Offensive assistant/quarterbacks – Joe Graves; Offensive assistant/wide receivers – Andrew Hayes-Stoker; Offensive assistant – Miguel Reveles; Offensive quality control – Deuce Schwartz; Offensive quality control – Jacob Webster	Defensive coaches: Defensive coordinator – Robert Saleh; Defensive line – Kris Kocurek; Assistant defensive line – Greg Scruggs; Linebackers – Johnny Holland; Defensive passing game specialist/defensive backs – Daniel Bullocks; Defensive backs/cornerbacks – Ray Brown; Defensive quality control – Cameron Brown; Defensive quality control – Jake Lynch; Defensive quality control – K. J. Wright; Special teams coaches: Special teams coordinator – Brant Boyer; Assistant special teams – Colt Anderson; Special teams quality control – Ronald Blair III; Chief of staff/football – Patrick Hagedorn; Coaching operations assistant – Max Molz; Strength and conditioning: Vice President, Player Health & Performance – Dustin Perry; Head strength and conditioning – Mike Nicolini; Assistant strength and conditioning – Jordan Nieuwsma; Assistant strength and conditioning – Greg Segrove; Assistant strength and conditioning – Chauncey Scissum

== Final roster ==
2025 San Francisco 49ers roster
Quarterbacks (QB): 10 Mac Jones; 13 Brock Purdy; Running backs (RB): 31 Isaac Guerendo; 29 Jordan James; 44 Kyle Juszczyk FB; 23 Christian McCaffrey; 3 Brian Robinson Jr.; Wide receivers (WR): 84 Kendrick Bourne; 15 Jauan Jennings; 9 Skyy Moore; 1 Ricky Pearsall; 5 Demarcus Robinson; 17 Jordan Watkins; Tight ends (TE): 89 Luke Farrell; 88 Jake Tonges; 82 Brayden Willis	Offensive linemen (OL): 64 Jake Brendel C; 74 Spencer Burford G; 75 Connor Colby LG; 61 Matt Hennessy C; 68 Colton McKivitz RT; 62 Austen Pleasants RT; 77 Dominick Puni RG; 71 Trent Williams LT; Defensive linemen (DL): 51 Robert Beal Jr. DE; 95 Alfred Collins DT; 93 Kalia Davis DT; 92 Jordan Elliott DT; 96 Clelin Ferrell DE; 90 Kevin Givens DT; 94 Yetur Gross-Matos DE; 47 Bryce Huff DE; 91 Sam Okuayinonu DE; 99 CJ West DT; 56 Keion White DE	Linebackers (LB): 57 Luke Gifford OLB; 43 Eric Kendricks OLB; 59 Curtis Robinson OLB; 49 Garret Wallow MLB; 53 Dee Winters OLB; Defensive backs (DB): 27 Ji'Ayir Brown FS; 0 Renardo Green CB; 2 Deommodore Lenoir CB; 26 Chase Lucas CB; 28 Darrell Luter Jr. CB; 6 Malik Mustapha FS; 33 Siran Neal CB; 25 Jason Pinnock FS; 36 Marques Sigle S; 20 Upton Stout CB; Special teams (ST): 7 Thomas Morstead P; 18 Eddy Piñeiro K; 46 Jon Weeks LS	Practice squad: 67 Isaac Alarcón LT (IPP); 58 Evan Anderson DT; 30 Eli Apple CB; 86 Junior Bergen WR; 69 Will Bradley-King DE; 40 Derrick Canteen S; 50 Andrew Farmer OLB; 22 Darrick Forrest S; 41 Jalen Graham MLB; 4 Adrian Martinez QB; 66 Drake Nugent C; 60 Brandon Parker RT; 83 Hayden Rucci TE; 81 Malik Turner WR; 55 Sebastian Valdez DT; 38 Kyzir White MLB; 63 Nick Zakelj G; Reserve: 11 Brandon Aiyuk WR (Left squad); 78 Ben Bartch G (IR); 48 Tatum Bethune MLB (IR); 97 Nick Bosa DE (IR); 19 Jacob Cowing WR (IR/DFR); -- Colton Dowell WR (Futures); -- Milo Eifler OLB (Futures); 56 Tarron Jackson DE (IR); 85 George Kittle TE (IR); 45 Nick Martin OLB (IR); 49 Jakob Robinson CB (IR); 4 Kurtis Rourke QB (NF-Inj.); 32 Patrick Taylor RB (IR); 81 Trent Taylor WR (IR); 35 Tre Tomlinson CB (IR); 54 Fred Warner MLB (IR/DFR); 98 Mykel Williams DE (IR); Rookies in italics 53 active, 17 reserve, 17 practice squad

== Preseason ==
Week	Date	Opponent	Result	Record	Venue	Recap
1	August 9	Denver Broncos	L 9–30	0–1	Levi's Stadium	Recap
2	August 16	at Las Vegas Raiders	W 22–19	1–1	Allegiant Stadium	Recap
3	August 23	Los Angeles Chargers	W 30–23	2–1	Levi's Stadium	Recap

== Regular season ==
=== Schedule ===
Week	Date	Opponent	Result	Record	Venue	Recap
1	September 7	at **Seattle Seahawks**	**W** 17–13	1–0	Lumen Field	Recap
2	September 14	at New Orleans Saints	**W** 26–21	2–0	Caesars Superdome	Recap
3	September 21	**Arizona Cardinals**	**W** 16–15	3–0	Levi's Stadium	Recap
4	September 28	Jacksonville Jaguars	**L** 21–26	3–1	Levi's Stadium	Recap
5	October 2	at **Los Angeles Rams**	**W** 26–23 (OT)	4–1	SoFi Stadium	Recap
6	October 12	at Tampa Bay Buccaneers	**L** 19–30	4–2	Raymond James Stadium	Recap
7	October 19	Atlanta Falcons	**W** 20–10	5–2	Levi's Stadium	Recap
8	October 26	at Houston Texans	**L** 15–26	5–3	NRG Stadium	Recap
9	November 2	at New York Giants	**W** 34–24	6–3	MetLife Stadium	Recap
10	November 9	**Los Angeles Rams**	**L** 26–42	6–4	Levi's Stadium	Recap
11	November 16	at **Arizona Cardinals**	**W** 41–22	7–4	State Farm Stadium	Recap
12	November 24	Carolina Panthers	**W** 20–9	8–4	Levi's Stadium	Recap
13	November 30	at Cleveland Browns	**W** 26–8	9–4	Huntington Bank Field	Recap
14	Bye					
15	December 14	Tennessee Titans	**W** 37–24	10–4	Levi's Stadium	Recap
16	December 22	at Indianapolis Colts	**W** 48–27	11–4	Lucas Oil Stadium	Recap
17	December 28	Chicago Bears	**W** 42–38	12–4	Levi's Stadium	Recap
18	January 3	**Seattle Seahawks**	**L** 3–13	12–5	Levi's Stadium	Recap
Note: Intra-division opponents are in **bold** text.

=== Game summaries ===
==== Week 1: at Seattle Seahawks ====
Week 1: San Francisco 49ers at Seattle Seahawks – Game summary

Quarter	1	2	3	4	Total
**49ers**	7	0	0	10	**17**
Seahawks	0	10	0	3	**13**

at Lumen Field, Seattle, Washington

- Date: September 7
- Game time: 1:05 p.m. PDT
- Game weather: Cloudy, 67 °F (19 °C)
- Game attendance: 68,752
- Referee: Shawn Hochuli
- TV announcers (Fox): Joe Davis, Greg Olsen and Pam Oliver
- Recap, Game Book

Game information

**First quarter**

- SF – George Kittle 5-yard pass from Brock Purdy (Jake Moody kick), 3:43. 49ers 7–0. **Drive: 14 plays, 95 yards, 8:22.**

**Second quarter**

- SEA – Zach Charbonnet 1-yard run (Jason Myers kick), 13:38. Tied 7–7. **Drive: 10 plays, 69 yards, 5:05.**
- SEA – Jason Myers 48-yard field goal, 0:02. Seahawks 10–7. **Drive: 8 plays, 50 yards, 0:55.**

**Third quarter**

- No scoring plays.

**Fourth quarter.**

- SF – Jake Moody 32-yard field goal, 9:42. Tied 10–10. **Drive: 11 plays, 52 yards, 5:08.**
- SEA – Jason Myers 37-yard field goal, 3:24. Seahawks 13–10. **Drive: 8 plays, 34 yards, 3:42.**
- SF – Jake Tonges 4-yard pass from Brock Purdy (Jake Moody kick), 1:34. 49ers 17–13. **Drive: 7 plays, 68 yards, 1:50.**

**Top passers**

- SF – Brock Purdy – 26/35, 277 yards, 2 TD, 2 INT
- SEA – Sam Darnold – 16/23, 150 yards

**Top rushers**

- SF – Christian McCaffrey – 22 rushes, 69 yards
- SEA – Zach Charbonnet – 12 rushes, 47 yards, TD

**Top receivers**

- SF – Ricky Pearsall – 4 receptions, 108 yards
- SEA – Jaxon Smith-Njigba – 9 receptions, 124 yards

With their fourth straight win in Seattle, the 49ers started 1–0 for the third consecutive season.

==== Week 2: at New Orleans Saints ====
Week 2: San Francisco 49ers at New Orleans Saints – Game summary

Quarter	1	2	3	4	Total
**49ers**	6	10	3	7	**26**
Saints	0	7	7	7	**21**

at Caesars Superdome, New Orleans, Louisiana

- Date: September 14
- Game time: 12:00 p.m. CDT/10:00 a.m. PDT
- Game weather: None (indoor stadium)
- Game attendance: 70,078
- Referee: Shawn Smith
- TV announcers (Fox): Kevin Kugler, Daryl Johnston and Allison Williams
- Recap, Game Book

Game information

**First quarter**

- SF – Luke Farrell 11-yard pass from Mac Jones (kick failed), 3:25. 49ers 6–0. **Drive: 14 plays, 80 yards, 7:56.**

**Second quarter**

- SF – Eddy Piñeiro 44-yard field goal, 3:43. 49ers 9–0. **Drive: 9 plays, 39 yards, 5:02.**
- NO – Juwan Johnson 18-yard pass from Spencer Rattler (Blake Grupe kick), 1:14. 49ers 9–7. **Drive: 12 plays, 84 yards, 5:34.**
- SF – Christian McCaffrey 7-yard pass from Mac Jones (Eddy Piñeiro kick), 0:07. 49ers 16–7. **Drive: 9 plays, 77 yards, 1:07.**

**Third quarter**

- NO – Rashid Shaheed 3-yard pass from Spencer Rattler (Blake Grupe kick), 7:11. 49ers 16–14. **Drive: 10 plays, 47 yards, 5:08.**
- SF – Eddy Piñeiro 46-yard field goal, 3:20. 49ers 19–14. **Drive: 8 plays, 49 yards, 3:51.**

**Fourth quarter**

- SF – Jauan Jennings 42-yard pass from Mac Jones (Eddy Piñeiro kick), 12:18. 49ers 26–14. **Drive: 7 plays, 68 yards, 4:20.**
- NO – Devaughn Vele 3-yard pass from Spencer Rattler (Blake Grupe kick), 6:18. 49ers 26–21. **Drive: 13 plays, 71 yards, 6:00.**

**Top passers**

- SF – Mac Jones – 26/39, 279 yards, 3 TD
- NO – Spencer Rattler – 25/34, 206 yards, 3 TD

**Top rushers**

- SF – Christian McCaffrey – 13 rushes, 55 yards
- NO – Alvin Kamara – 21 rushes, 100 yards

**Top receivers**

- SF – Jauan Jennings – 5 receptions, 89 yards, TD
- NO – Chris Olave – 6 receptions, 53 yards

==== Week 3: vs. Arizona Cardinals ====
Week 3: Arizona Cardinals at San Francisco 49ers – Game summary

Quarter	1	2	3	4	Total
Cardinals	0	3	3	9	**15**
**49ers**	0	6	0	10	**16**

at Levi's Stadium, Santa Clara, California

- Date: September 21
- Game time: 1:25 p.m. PDT
- Game weather: Sunny, 72 °F (22 °C)
- Game attendance: 70,414
- Referee: John Hussey
- TV announcers (Fox): Adam Amin, Mark Sanchez and Kristina Pink
- Recap, Game Book

Game information

**First quarter**

- No scoring plays.

**Second quarter**

- ARI – Chad Ryland 34-yard field goal, 8:45. Cardinals 3–0. **Drive: 8 plays, 49 yards, 6:09.**
- SF – Eddy Piñeiro 38-yard field goal, 4:22. Tied 3–3. **Drive: 9 plays, 49 yards, 4:23.**
- SF – Eddy Piñeiro 51-yard field goal, 0:17. 49ers 6–3. **Drive: 11 plays, 53 yards, 1:51.**

**Third quarter**

- ARI – Chad Ryland 28-yard field goal, 6:37. Tied 6–6. **Drive: 15 plays, 77 yards, 6:35.**

**Fourth quarter**

- SF – Kyle Juszczyk 1-yard pass from Mac Jones (Eddy Piñeiro kick), 10:50. 49ers 13–6. **Drive: 6 plays, 48 yards, 3:09.**
- ARI – Trey McBride 1-yard pass from Kyler Murray (Chad Ryland kick), 8:37. Tied 13–13. **Drive: 4 plays, 65 yards, 2:13.**
- ARI – Penalty on Dominick Puni enforced in end zone for safety, 3:15. Cardinals 15–13.
- SF – Eddy Piñeiro 35-yard field goal, 0:00. 49ers 16–15. **Drive: 10 plays, 63 yards, 1:46.**

**Top passers**

- ARI – Kyler Murray – 22/35, 159 yards, TD
- SF – Mac Jones – 27/41, 284 yards, TD, INT

**Top rushers**

- ARI – Trey Benson – 10 rushes, 42 yards
- SF – Christian McCaffrey – 17 rushes, 52 yards

**Top receivers**

- ARI – Marvin Harrison Jr. – 3 receptions, 44 yards
- SF – Ricky Pearsall – 8 receptions, 117 yards

49ers kicker Eddy Piñeiro made a game-winning 35-yard field goal as time expired, giving the 49ers a 16–15 victory. Despite the win, it was later revealed that defensive end Nick Bosa would miss the remainder of the season after suffering a torn ACL in his right knee.

==== Week 4: vs. Jacksonville Jaguars ====
Week 4: Jacksonville Jaguars at San Francisco 49ers – Game summary

Quarter	1	2	3	4	Total
**Jaguars**	0	17	9	0	**26**
49ers	3	3	8	7	**21**

at Levi's Stadium, Santa Clara, California

- Date: September 28
- Game time: 1:05 p.m. PDT
- Game weather: Cloudy, 72 °F (22 °C)
- Game attendance: 70,495
- Referee: Clete Blakeman
- TV announcers (Fox): Adam Amin, Mark Sanchez and Kristina Pink
- Recap, Game Book

Game information

**First quarter**

- SF – Eddy Piñeiro 26-yard field goal, 8:33. 49ers 3–0. **Drive: 13 plays, 57 yards, 6:27.**

**Second quarter**

- JAX – Travis Etienne Jr. 48-yard run (Cam Little kick), 14:41. Jaguars 7–3. **Drive: 1 play, 48 yards, 0:09.**
- JAX – Hunter Long 4-yard pass from Trevor Lawrence (Cam Little kick), 5:01. Jaguars 14–3. **Drive: 13 plays, 89 yards, 8:01.**
- SF – Eddy Piñeiro 23-yard field goal, 0:40. Jaguars 14–6. **Drive: 12 plays, 54 yards, 1:48.**
- JAX – Cam Little 26-yard field goal, 0:00. Jaguars 17–6. **Drive: 6 plays, 39 yards, 0:40.**

**Third quarter**

- SF – Christian McCaffrey 8-yard pass from Brock Purdy (Jauan Jennings-Brock Purdy pass), 8:32. Jaguars 17–14. **Drive: 8 plays, 73 yards, 4:04.**
- JAX – Cam Little 44-yard field goal, 4:07. Jaguars 20–14. **Drive: 4 plays, 3 yards, 1:55.**
- JAX – Parker Washington 87-yard punt return (pass failed), 4:07. Jaguars 26–14.

**Fourth quarter**

- SF – Jake Tonges 21-yard pass from Brock Purdy (Eddy Piñeiro kick), 7:41. Jaguars 26–21. **Drive: 8 plays, 92 yards, 4:16.**

**Top passers**

- JAX – Trevor Lawrence – 21/31, 174 yards, TD
- SF – Brock Purdy – 22/38, 309 yards, 2 TD, 2 INT

**Top rushers**

- JAX – Travis Etienne Jr. – 19 rushes, 124 yards, TD
- SF – Christian McCaffrey – 17 rushes, 49 yards

**Top receivers**

- JAX – Brian Thomas Jr. – 5 receptions, 49 yards
- SF – Christian McCaffrey – 6 receptions, 92 yards, TD

The 49ers lost to the Jaguars for the first time since the 2005 season and recorded their first-ever home loss to them. Following the game, Jaguars coach Liam Coen and 49ers defensive coordinator Robert Saleh had to be separated during a heated postgame exchange, after Saleh made a remark earlier in the week about the Jaguars 'legally stealing signals.'

==== Week 5: at Los Angeles Rams ====
Week 5: San Francisco 49ers at Los Angeles Rams – Game summary

Quarter	1	2	3	4	OT	Total
**49ers**	7	10	3	3	3	**26**
Rams	0	7	7	9	0	**23**

at SoFi Stadium, Inglewood, California

- Date: October 2
- Game time: 5:15 p.m. PDT
- Game weather: Cloudy, 71 °F (22 °C) (fixed roof)
- Game attendance: 73,652
- Referee: Bill Vinovich
- TV announcers (Prime Video): Al Michaels, Kirk Herbstreit and Kaylee Hartung
- Recap, Game Book

Game information

**First quarter**

- SF – Jake Tonges 6-yard pass from Mac Jones (Eddy Piñeiro kick), 10:09. 49ers 7–0. **Drive: 8 plays, 72 yards, 4:51.**

**Second quarter**

- SF – Christian McCaffrey 1-yard pass from Mac Jones (Eddy Piñeiro kick), 13:44. 49ers 14–0. **Drive: 17 plays, 91 yards, 8:15.**
- LAR – Kyren Williams 14-yard pass from Matthew Stafford (Joshua Karty kick), 2:09. 49ers 14–7. **Drive: 13 plays, 57 yards, 6:27.**
- SF – Eddy Piñeiro 37-yard field goal, 0:00. 49ers 17–7. **Drive: 12 plays, 48 yards, 2:09.**

**Third quarter**

- SF – Eddy Piñeiro 20-yard field goal, 6:33. 49ers 20–7. **Drive: 12 plays, 55 yards, 6:13.**
- LAR – Puka Nacua 1-yard pass from Matthew Stafford (Joshua Karty kick), 3:45. 49ers 20–14. **Drive: 7 plays, 69 yards, 2:48.**

**Fourth quarter**

- LAR – Kyren Williams 8-yard pass from Matthew Stafford (kick blocked), 10:39. Tied 20–20. **Drive: 9 plays, 88 yards, 3:24.**
- SF – Eddy Piñeiro 59-yard field goal, 2:52. 49ers 23–20. **Drive: 12 plays, 57 yards, 5:12.**
- LAR – Joshua Karty 48-yard field goal, 0:02. Tied 23–23. **Drive: 7 plays, 20 yards, 0:40.**

**Overtime**

- SF – Eddy Piñeiro 41-yard field goal, 5:51. 49ers 26–23. **Drive: 8 plays, 37 yards, 4:09.**

**Top passers**

- SF – Mac Jones – 33/49, 342 yards, 2 TD
- LAR – Matthew Stafford – 30/47, 389 yards, 3 TD

**Top rushers**

- SF – Christian McCaffrey – 22 rushes, 57 yards
- LAR – Kyren Williams – 14 rushes, 65 yards

**Top receivers**

- SF – Kendrick Bourne – 10 receptions, 142 yards
- LAR – Davante Adams – 5 receptions, 88 yards

With the hard-fought win, the 49ers improve to 4–1 while securing their first win over the Rams since Week 2 of 2023, snapping a three-game losing streak to them.

==== Week 6: at Tampa Bay Buccaneers ====
Week 6: San Francisco 49ers at Tampa Bay Buccaneers – Game summary

Quarter	1	2	3	4	Total
49ers	3	13	3	0	**19**
**Buccaneers**	7	13	7	3	**30**

at Raymond James Stadium, Tampa, Florida

- Date: October 12
- Game time: 4:25 p.m. EDT/1:25 p.m. PDT
- Game weather: Clear, 82 °F (28 °C)
- Game attendance: 62,411
- Referee: Brad Rogers
- TV announcers (CBS): Jim Nantz, Tony Romo and Tracy Wolfson
- Recap, Game Book

Game information

**First quarter**

- TB – Rachaad White 2-yard run (Chase McLaughlin kick), 9:54. Buccaneers 7–0. **Drive: 2 plays, 12 yards, 0:43.**
- SF – Eddy Piñeiro 52-yard field goal, 7:54. Buccaneers 7–3. **Drive: 5 plays, 36 yards, 2:00.**

**Second quarter**

- SF – Christian McCaffrey 1-yard run (Eddy Piñeiro kick), 10:18. 49ers 10–7. **Drive: 10 plays, 84 yards, 4:44.**
- TB – Sean Tucker 9-yard run (Chase McLaughlin kick), 5:10. Buccaneers 14–10. **Drive: 8 plays, 68 yards, 5:08.**
- SF – Eddy Piñeiro 54-yard field goal, 2:05. Buccaneers 14–13. **Drive: 7 plays, 27 yards, 3:05.**
- TB – Kameron Johnson 34-yard pass from Baker Mayfield (Two-point run failed), 0:44. Buccaneers 20–13. **Drive: 5 plays, 72 yards, 1:21.**
- SF – Eddy Piñeiro 42-yard field goal, 0:02. Buccaneers 20–16. **Drive: 6 plays, 47 yards, 0:42.**

**Third quarter**

- SF – Eddy Piñeiro 29-yard field goal, 7:27. Buccaneers 20–19. **Drive: 14 plays, 65 yards, 7:33.**
- TB – Tez Johnson 45-yard pass from Baker Mayfield (Chase McLaughlin kick), 2:40. Buccaneers 27–19. **Drive: 8 plays, 66 yards, 4:47.**

**Fourth quarter**

- TB – Chase McLaughlin 45-yard field goal, 1:55. Buccaneers 30–19. **Drive: 8 plays, 38 yards, 3:48.**

**Top passers**

- SF – Mac Jones – 27/39, 347 yards, 2 INT
- TB – Baker Mayfield – 17/23, 256 yards, 2 TD

**Top rushers**

- SF – Christian McCaffrey – 17 rushes, 54 yards, TD
- TB – Rachaad White – 17 rushes, 65 yards, TD

**Top receivers**

- SF – Kendrick Bourne – 5 receptions, 142 yards
- TB – Kameron Johnson – 4 receptions, 64 yards, TD

With the loss, the 49ers fell to 4–2. Following the game, it was revealed that linebacker Fred Warner would miss the remainder of the season after suffering a dislocated and broken ankle midway through the game.

==== Week 7: vs. Atlanta Falcons ====
Week 7: Atlanta Falcons at San Francisco 49ers – Game summary

Quarter	1	2	3	4	Total
Falcons	0	3	7	0	**10**
**49ers**	0	10	3	7	**20**

at Levi's Stadium, Santa Clara, California

- Date: October 19
- Game time: 5:20 p.m. PDT
- Game weather: Sunny, 74 °F (23 °C)
- Game attendance: 71,217
- Referee: Ron Torbert
- TV announcers (NBC): Mike Tirico, Cris Collinsworth and Melissa Stark
- Recap, Game Book

Game information

**First quarter**

- No scoring plays.

**Second quarter**

- ATL – Parker Romo 38-yard field goal, 12:54. Falcons 3–0. **Drive: 19 plays, 60 yards, 10:40.**
- SF – Christian McCaffrey 1-yard run (Eddy Piñeiro kick), 1:48. 49ers 7–3. **Drive: 13 plays, 80 yards, 6:10.**
- SF – Eddy Piñeiro 55-yard field goal, 0:38. 49ers 10–3. **Drive: 4 plays, 3 yards, 0:50.**

**Third quarter**

- SF – Eddy Piñeiro 43-yard field goal, 10:09. 49ers 13–3. **Drive: 11 plays, 43 yards, 4:51.**
- ATL – Bijan Robinson 10-yard pass from Michael Penix Jr. (Parker Romo kick), 6:28. 49ers 13–10. **Drive: 6 plays, 48 yards, 3:41.**

**Fourth quarter**

- SF – Christian McCaffrey 4-yard run (Eddy Piñeiro kick), 2:26. 49ers 20–10. **Drive: 11 plays, 64 yards, 5:50.**

**Top passers**

- ATL – Michael Penix Jr. – 21/38, 241 yards, TD
- SF – Mac Jones – 17/26, 152 yards, INT

**Top rushers**

- ATL – Bijan Robinson – 14 rushes, 40 yards
- SF – Christian McCaffrey – 24 rushes, 129 yards, 2 TD

**Top receivers**

- ATL – Darnell Mooney – 3 receptions, 68 yards
- SF – Christian McCaffrey – 7 receptions, 72 yards

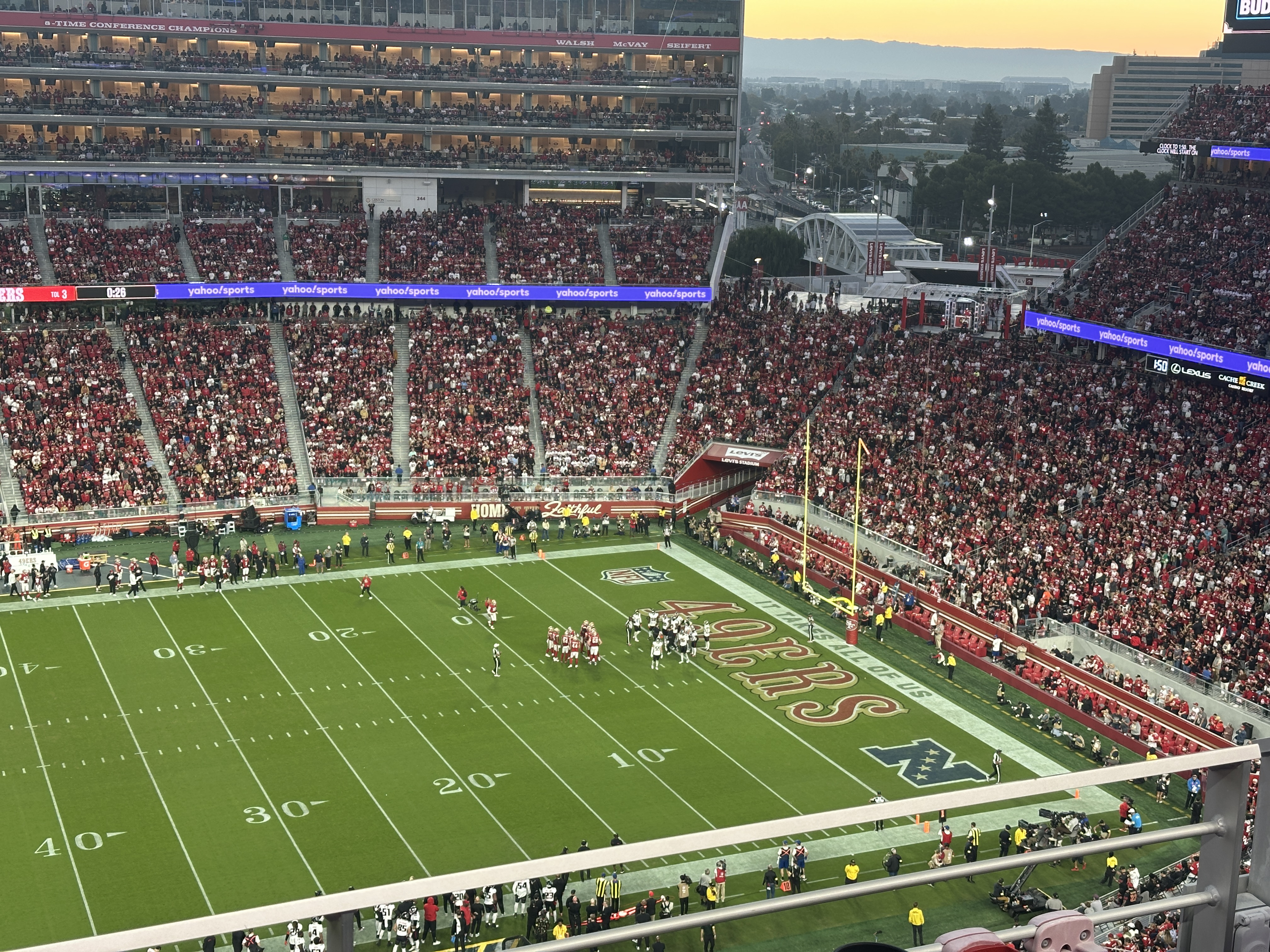
Levi's Stadium during the 49ers' Week 7 game against Atlanta, showing the field just before the team's second-quarter touchdown by Christian McCaffrey.

The 49ers rebounded from their loss to Tampa Bay to improve to 5–2 overall and 2–1 against the NFC South.

==== Week 8: at Houston Texans ====
Week 8: San Francisco 49ers at Houston Texans – Game summary

Quarter	1	2	3	4	Total
49ers	0	7	8	0	**15**
**Texans**	3	13	7	3	**26**

at NRG Stadium, Houston, Texas

- Date: October 26
- Game time: 12:00 p.m. CDT/10:00 a.m. PDT
- Game weather: None (retractable roof closed)
- Game attendance: 70,581
- Referee: Alan Eck
- TV announcers (Fox): Kevin Kugler, Daryl Johnston and Allison Williams
- Recap, Game Book

Game information

**First quarter**

- HOU – Ka'imi Fairbairn 33-yard field goal, 5:21. Texans 3–0. **Drive: 16 plays, 57 yards, 9:39.**

**Second quarter**

- HOU – Ka'imi Fairbairn 34-yard field goal, 14:57. Texans 6–0. **Drive: 9 plays, 71 yards, 3:40.**
- HOU – Jayden Higgins 12-yard pass from C. J. Stroud (Ka'imi Fairbairn kick), 7:32. Texans 13–0. **Drive: 10 plays, 82 yards, 5:53.**
- HOU – Ka'imi Fairbairn 37-yard field goal, 0:58. Texans 16–0. **Drive: 11 plays, 62 yards, 4:54.**
- SF – George Kittle 17-yard pass from Mac Jones (Eddy Piñeiro kick), 0:25. Texans 16–7. **Drive: 4 plays, 35 yards, 0:33.**

**Third quarter**

- HOU – Xavier Hutchinson 30-yard pass from C. J. Stroud (Ka'imi Fairbairn kick), 7:29. Texans 23–7. **Drive: 12 plays, 94 yards, 6:07.**
- SF – Jake Tonges 2-yard pass from Mac Jones (Mac Jones–Demarcus Robinson pass), 0:28. Texans 23–15. **Drive: 12 plays, 76 yards, 7:01.**

**Fourth quarter**

- HOU – Ka'imi Fairbairn 30-yard field goal, 9:41. Texans 26–15. **Drive: 10 plays, 58 yards, 5:47.**

**Top passers**

- SF – Mac Jones – 19/32, 193 yards, 2 TD, INT
- HOU – C. J. Stroud – 30/39, 318 yards, 2 TD, INT

**Top rushers**

- SF – Christian McCaffrey – 8 rushes, 25 yards
- HOU – Woody Marks – 11 rushes, 62 yards

**Top receivers**

- SF – Jauan Jennings – 4 receptions, 45 yards
- HOU – Xavier Hutchinson – 5 receptions, 69 yards, TD

The 49ers faced off against Texans' head coach DeMeco Ryans, who served on San Francisco's coaching staff from 2017 to 2022. The 49ers ended an NFL-record streak of 14 consecutive games without an interception, spanning 469 pass attempts, when cornerback Deommodore Lenoir intercepted Texans quarterback C. J. Stroud on the final play of the first half. The 49ers also finished with 10 rushing attempts, setting a franchise-low record.

With their first loss to Houston since 2009, the 49ers dropped to 5–3 and 0–2 against the AFC South.

==== Week 9: at New York Giants ====
Week 9: San Francisco 49ers at New York Giants – Game summary

Quarter	1	2	3	4	Total
**49ers**	7	10	3	14	**34**
Giants	7	0	3	14	**24**

at MetLife Stadium, East Rutherford, New Jersey

- Date: November 2
- Game time: 1:00 p.m. EST/10:00 a.m. PST
- Game weather: Fair, 56 °F (13 °C)
- Game attendance: 83,258
- Referee: John Hussey
- TV announcers (CBS): Kevin Harlan, Trent Green and Melanie Collins
- Recap, Game Book

Game information

**First quarter**

- NYG – Theo Johnson 15-yard pass from Jaxson Dart (Graham Gano kick), 10:50. Giants 7–0. **Drive: 10 plays, 64 yards, 4:10.**
- SF – Christian McCaffrey 5-yard pass from Mac Jones (Eddy Pineiro kick), 4:16. Tied 7–7. **Drive: 12 plays, 68 yards, 6:34.**

**Second quarter**

- SF – Jauan Jennings 11-yard pass from Mac Jones (Eddy Pineiro kick), 13:08. 49ers 14–7. **Drive: 8 plays, 80 yards, 4:03.**
- SF – Eddy Pineiro 54-yard field goal, 1:55. 49ers 17–7. **Drive: 4 plays, 5 yards, 1:37.**

**Third quarter**

- SF – Eddy Pineiro 33-yard field goal, 9:55. 49ers 20–7. **Drive: 13 plays, 46 yards, 5:05.**
- NYG – Graham Gano 22-yard field goal, 6:42. 49ers 20–10. **Drive: 8 plays, 64 yards, 3:13.**

**Fourth quarter**

- SF – Brian Robinson Jr. 18-yard run (Eddy Pineiro kick), 11:35. 49ers 27–10. **Drive: 9 plays, 76 yards, 4:58.**
- NYG – Jaxson Dart 6-yard run (Graham Gano kick), 7:52. 49ers 27–17. **Drive: 7 plays, 65 yards, 3:43.**
- SF – Christian McCaffrey 3-yard run (Eddy Pineiro kick), 4:13. 49ers 34–17. **Drive: 6 plays, 60 yards, 3:39.**
- NYG – Gunner Olszewski 24-yard pass from Jaxson Dart (Graham Gano kick), 1:21. 49ers 34–24. **Drive: 9 plays, 69 yards, 2:52.**

**Top passers**

- SF – Mac Jones – 19/24, 235 yards, 2 TD
- NYG – Jaxson Dart – 24/33, 191 yards, 2 TD

**Top rushers**

- SF – Christian McCaffrey – 28 rushes, 106 yards, TD
- NYG – Jaxson Dart – 8 rushes, 56 yards, TD

**Top receivers**

- SF – Christian McCaffrey – 5 receptions, 67 yards, TD
- NYG – Darius Slayton – 5 receptions, 62 yards

With the win, the 49ers matched their win total from 2024 and improved to 6–3.

==== Week 10: vs. Los Angeles Rams ====
Week 10: Los Angeles Rams at San Francisco 49ers – Game summary

Quarter	1	2	3	4	Total
**Rams**	14	7	7	14	**42**
49ers	0	7	7	12	**26**

at Levi's Stadium, Santa Clara, California

- Date: November 9
- Game time: 1:25 p.m. PST
- Game weather: Sunny, 77 °F (25 °C)
- Game attendance: 71,239
- Referee: Land Clark
- TV announcers (Fox): Kevin Burkhardt, Tom Brady, Erin Andrews and Tom Rinaldi
- Recap, Game Book

Game information

**First quarter**

- LAR – Kyren Williams 2-yard run (Harrison Mevis kick), 10:14. Rams 7–0. **Drive: 10 plays, 64 yards, 4:46.**
- LAR – Puka Nacua 22-yard pass from Matthew Stafford (Harrison Mevis kick), 5:34. Rams 14–0. **Drive: 7 plays, 86 yards, 3:20.**

**Second quarter**

- LAR – Davis Allen 4-yard pass from Matthew Stafford (Harrison Mevis kick), 13:41. Rams 21–0. **Drive: 9 plays, 59 yards, 4:33.**
- SF – Jauan Jennings 6-yard pass from Mac Jones (Eddy Pineiro kick), 3:15. Rams 21–7. **Drive: 7 plays, 36 yards, 3:29.**

**Third quarter**

- SF – Brian Robinson Jr. 1-yard run (Eddy Pineiro kick), 9:33. Rams 21–14. **Drive: 10 plays, 65 yards, 5:27.**
- LAR – Davante Adams 2-yard pass from Matthew Stafford (Harrison Mevis kick), 2:39. Rams 28–14. **Drive:12 plays, 64 yards, 6:54.**

**Fourth quarter**

- SF – Luke Farrell 9-yard pass from Mac Jones (kick blocked), 12:29. Rams 28–20. **Drive: 10 plays, 70 yards, 5:10.**
- LAR – Kyren Williams 7-yard run (Harrison Mevis kick), 10:04. Rams 35–20. **Drive: 5 plays, 64 yards, 2:25.**
- LAR – Colby Parkinson 16-yard pass from Matthew Stafford (Harrison Mevis kick), 5:10. Rams 42–20. **Drive: 6 plays, 38 yards, 3:19.**
- SF – George Kittle 13-yard pass from Mac Jones (pass failed), 2:59. Rams 42–26. **Drive: 7 plays, 65 yards, 2:11.**

**Top passers**

- LAR – Matthew Stafford – 24/36, 280 yards, 4 TD
- SF – Mac Jones – 33/39, 319 yards, 3 TD, INT

**Top rushers**

- LAR – Kyren Williams – 14 rushes, 73 yards, 2 TD
- SF – Brian Robinson Jr. – 8 rushes, 41 yards, TD

**Top receivers**

- LAR – Davante Adams – 6 receptions, 77 yards, TD
- SF – George Kittle – 9 receptions, 84 yards, TD

With their fourth loss in their last five games against the Rams, the 49ers fell to 6–4.

==== Week 11: at Arizona Cardinals ====
Week 11: San Francisco 49ers at Arizona Cardinals – Game summary

Quarter	1	2	3	4	Total
**49ers**	13	12	10	6	**41**
Cardinals	7	3	0	12	**22**

at State Farm Stadium, Glendale, Arizona

- Date: November 16
- Game time: 2:05 p.m. MST/1:05 p.m. PST
- Game weather: Mostly cloudy, 73 °F (23 °C) (retractable roof open)
- Game attendance: 65,032
- Referee: Carl Cheffers
- TV announcers (Fox): Kevin Kugler, Daryl Johnston and Allison Williams
- Recap, Game Book

Game information

**First quarter**

- SF – Christian McCaffrey 1-yard run (Eddy Pineiro kick), 14:44. 49ers 7–0. **Drive: 1 play, 1 yard, 0:16.**
- SF – George Kittle 30-yard pass from Brock Purdy (kick blocked), 9:51. 49ers 13–0. **Drive: 5 plays, 70 yards, 2:08.**
- ARI – Bam Knight 6-yard run (Chad Ryland kick), 4:58. 49ers 13–7. **Drive: 9 plays, 72 yards, 4:53.**

**Second quarter**

- SF – Christian McCaffrey 9-yard pass from Brock Purdy (kick failed), 13:39. 49ers 19–7. **Drive: 5 plays, 52 yards, 2:16.**
- ARI – Chad Ryland 26-yard field goal, 6:29. 49ers 19–10. **Drive: 12 plays, 63 yards, 7:10.**
- SF – Eddy Pineiro 48-yard field goal, 1:01. 49ers 22–10. **Drive: 6 plays, 31 yards, 1:49.**
- SF – Eddy Pineiro 47-yard field goal, 0:00. 49ers 25–10. **Drive: 3 plays, 38 yards, 0:19.**

**Third quarter**

- SF – Eddy Pineiro 47-yard field goal, 7:27. 49ers 28–10. **Drive: 9 plays, 39 yards, 5:05.**
- SF – George Kittle 4-yard pass from Brock Purdy (Eddy Pineiro kick), 2:32. 49ers 35–0. **Drive: 5 plays, 14 yards, 1:50.**

**Fourth quarter**

- ARI – Trey McBride 10-yard pass from Jacoby Brissett (run failed), 8:28. 49ers 35–16. **Drive: 10 plays, 65 yards, 3:17.**
- SF – Christian McCaffrey 4-yard run (pass failed), 4:44. 49ers 41–16. **Drive: 7 plays, 45 yards, 3:44.**
- ARI – Greg Dortch 17-yard pass from Jacoby Brissett (pass failed), 2:43. 49ers 41–22. **Drive: 8 plays, 65 yards, 2:01.**

**Top passers**

- SF – Brock Purdy – 19/26, 200 yards, 3 TD
- ARI – Jacoby Brissett – 47/57, 452 yards, 2 TD, 2 INT

**Top rushers**

- SF – Christian McCaffrey – 13 rushes, 81 yards, 2 TD
- ARI – Bam Knight – 5 rushes, 24 yards, TD

**Top receivers**

- SF – George Kittle – 6 receptions, 67 yards, 2 TD
- ARI – Michael Wilson – 15 receptions, 185 yards

Brock Purdy made his return after suffering a toe injury on September 28 against the Jacksonville Jaguars. Although the 49ers were outgained by more than 200 yards, they still dominated the Cardinals. With the victory, San Francisco surpassed its win total from the previous season.

==== Week 12: vs. Carolina Panthers ====
Week 12: Carolina Panthers at San Francisco 49ers – Game summary

Quarter	1	2	3	4	Total
Panthers	0	3	6	0	**9**
**49ers**	7	3	7	3	**20**

at Levi's Stadium, Santa Clara, California

- Date: November 24
- Game time: 5:15 p.m. PST
- Game weather: Sunny, 58 °F (14 °C)
- Game attendance: 71,337
- Referee: Alex Kemp
- TV announcers (ESPN): Joe Buck, Troy Aikman, Lisa Salters and Laura Rutledge
- Recap, Game Book

Game information

**First quarter**

- SF – Jauan Jennings 12-yard pass from Brock Purdy (Matt Gay kick), 6:17. 49ers 7–0. **Drive: 15 plays, 72 yards, 8:43.**

**Second quarter**

- CAR – Ryan Fitzgerald 25-yard field goal, 2:28. 49ers 7–3. **Drive: 7 plays, 26 yards, 3:51.**
- SF – Matt Gay 47-yard field goal, 1:00. 49ers 10–3. **Drive: 6 plays, 25 yards, 1:28.**

**Third quarter**

- SF – Christian McCaffrey 12-yard run (Matt Gay kick), 4:42. 49ers 17–3. **Drive: 13 plays, 80 yards, 7:43.**
- CAR – Tetairoa McMillan 29-yard pass from Bryce Young (pass failed), 0:49. 49ers 17–9. **Drive: 8 plays, 68 yards, 3:53.**

**Fourth quarter**

- SF – Matt Gay 29-yard field goal, 9:21. 49ers 20–9. **Drive: 10 plays, 59 yards, 6:28.**

**Top passers**

- CAR – Bryce Young – 18/29, 169 yards, TD, 2 INT
- SF – Brock Purdy – 23/32, 193 yards, TD, 3 INT

**Top rushers**

- CAR – Rico Dowdle – 6 rushes, 38 yards
- SF – Christian McCaffrey – 24 rushes, 89 yards, TD

**Top receivers**

- CAR – Rico Dowdle – 4 receptions, 36 yards
- SF – George Kittle – 6 receptions, 78 yards

Running back Christian McCaffrey faced his former team, the Carolina Panthers, whom he played for from 2017 to 2022, for the first time since being traded during the 2022 season. McCaffrey recorded 142 yards from scrimmage and a touchdown, helping the 49ers overcome three first-half interceptions by Purdy to secure the win.

Late in the game, Panthers safety Tre'von Moehrig struck Jauan Jennings in the groin following a run play. After the game, Jennings responded by punching Moehrig in the helmet. The NFL subsequently suspended Moehrig for one game without pay, while Jennings was fined $12,172 for his actions. With the win, the 49ers finished 3–1 against the NFC South.

==== Week 13: at Cleveland Browns ====
Week 13: San Francisco 49ers at Cleveland Browns – Game summary

Quarter	1	2	3	4	Total
**49ers**	7	3	7	9	**26**
Browns	0	8	0	0	**8**

at Huntington Bank Field, Cleveland, Ohio

- Date: November 30
- Game time: 1:00 p.m. EST/10:00 a.m. PST
- Game weather: Cloudy, 35 °F (2 °C)
- Game attendance: 64,042
- Referee: Brad Allen
- TV announcers (CBS): Kevin Harlan, Trent Green and Melanie Collins
- Recap, Game Book

Game information

**First quarter**

- SF – Christian McCaffrey 1-yard run (Matt Gay kick), 8:12. 49ers 7–0. **Drive: 6 plays, 16 yards, 2:10.**

**Second quarter**

- CLE – Harold Fannin Jr. 34-yard pass from Shedeur Sanders (Quinshon Judkins run), 0:39. Browns 8–7. **Drive: 10 plays, 90 yards, 5:42.**
- SF – Matt Gay 25-yard field goal, 0:00. 49ers 10–8. **Drive: 6 plays, 58 yards, 0:39.**

**Third quarter**

- SF – Brock Purdy 2-yard run (Matt Gay kick), 1:29. 49ers 17–8. **Drive: 9 plays, 32 yards, 5:36.**

**Fourth quarter**

- SF – Jauan Jennings 7-yard pass from Brock Purdy (pass failed), 11:05. 49ers 23–8. **Drive: 6 plays, 18 yards, 2:22.**
- SF – Matt Gay 31-yard field goal, 4:09. 49ers 26–8. **Drive: 9 plays, 29 yards, 3:15.**

**Top passers**

- SF – Brock Purdy – 16/29, 168 yards, TD
- CLE – Shedeur Sanders – 16/25, 149 yards, TD

**Top rushers**

- SF – Christian McCaffrey – 20 rushes, 53 yards, TD
- CLE – Quinshon Judkins – 23 rushes, 91 yards

**Top receivers**

- SF – George Kittle – 4 receptions, 67 yards
- CLE – Harold Fannin Jr. – 3 receptions, 43 yards, TD

With another dominant win, the 49ers improved to 9–4 entering their bye. This was also their first victory in Cleveland since 1984.

==== Week 15: vs. Tennessee Titans ====
Week 15: Tennessee Titans at San Francisco 49ers – Game summary

Quarter	1	2	3	4	Total
Titans	3	7	0	14	**24**
**49ers**	7	10	14	6	**37**

at Levi's Stadium, Santa Clara, California

- Date: December 14
- Game time: 1:25 p.m. PST
- Game weather: Cloudy, 54 °F (12 °C)
- Game attendance: 71,042
- Referee: Craig Wrolstad
- TV announcers (Fox): Adam Amin, Drew Brees and Kristina Pink
- Recap, Game Book

Game information

**First quarter**

- SF – Jauan Jennings 4-yard pass from Brock Purdy (Eddy Pineiro kick), 7:48. 49ers 7–0. **Drive: 12 plays, 70 yards, 6:03.**
- TEN – Joey Slye 25-yard field goal, 1:22. 49ers 7–3. **Drive: 10 plays, 63 yards, 6:26.**

**Second quarter**

- SF – Christian McCaffrey 1-yard run (Eddy Pineiro kick), 13:03. 49ers 14–3. **Drive: 7 plays, 70 yards, 3:19.**
- TEN – Gunnar Helm 34-yard pass from Cam Ward (Joey Slye kick), 7:43. 49ers 14–10. **Drive: 8 plays, 68 yards, 5:20.**
- SF – Eddy Pineiro 33-yard field goal, 0:56. 49ers 17–10. **Drive: 14 plays, 50 yards, 6:47.**

**Third quarter**

- SF – Jauan Jennings 13-yard pass from Brock Purdy (Eddy Pineiro kick), 12:54. 49ers 24–10. **Drive: 4 plays, 67 yards, 2:06.**
- SF – George Kittle 1-yard pass from Brock Purdy (Eddy Pineiro kick), 2:10. 49ers 31–10. **Drive: 15 plays, 95 yards, 9:14.**

**Fourth quarter**

- TEN – Jeffery Simmons 1-yard pass from Cam Ward (Joey Slye kick), 14:16. 49ers 31–17. **Drive: 2 plays, 44 yards, 0:30.**
- SF – Eddy Pineiro 37-yard field goal, 9:28. 49ers 34–17. **Drive: 8 plays, 41 yards, 4:48.**
- TEN – Tony Pollard 6-yard run (Joey Slye kick), 5:33. 49ers 34–24. **Drive: 10 plays, 64 yards, 3:55.**
- SF – Eddy Pineiro 40-yard field goal, 1:10. 49ers 37–24. **Drive: 10 plays, 43 yards, 4:23.**

**Top passers**

- TEN – Cam Ward – 18/29, 170 yards, 2 TD
- SF – Brock Purdy – 23/30, 295 yards, 3 TD

**Top rushers**

- TEN – Tony Pollard – 14 rushes, 104 yards, TD
- SF – Christian McCaffrey – 22 rushes, 73 yards, TD

**Top receivers**

- TEN – Gunnar Helm – 4 receptions, 49 yards, TD
- SF – Ricky Pearsall – 6 receptions, 96 yards

With the win, the 49ers improved to 10–4 and 1–2 against the AFC South.

==== Week 16: at Indianapolis Colts ====
Week 16: San Francisco 49ers at Indianapolis Colts – Game summary

Quarter	1	2	3	4	Total
**49ers**	14	10	10	14	**48**
Colts	7	10	3	7	**27**

at Lucas Oil Stadium, Indianapolis, Indiana

- Date: December 22
- Game time: 8:15 p.m. EST/5:15 p.m. PST
- Game weather: None (retractable roof closed)
- Game attendance: 66,265
- Referee: Ron Torbert
- TV announcers (ESPN/ABC/Disney+): Joe Buck, Troy Aikman, Lisa Salters and Laura Rutledge
- Recap, Game Book

Game information

**First quarter**

- IND – Alec Pierce 20-yard pass from Philip Rivers (Blake Grupe kick), 10:31. Colts 7–0. **Drive: 9 plays, 72 yards, 4:29.**
- SF – Demarcus Robinson 22-yard pass from Brock Purdy (Eddy Pineiro kick), 7:14. Tied 7–7. **Drive: 6 plays, 69 yards, 3:17.**
- SF – Christian McCaffrey 2-yard pass from Brock Purdy (Eddy Pineiro kick), 4:33. 49ers 14–7. **Drive: 5 plays, 26 yards, 2:35.**

**Second quarter**

- IND – Alec Pierce 16-yard pass from Philip Rivers (Blake Grupe kick), 14:15. Tied 14–14. **Drive: 12 plays, 66 yards, 5:18.'**
- SF – George Kittle 11-yard pass from Brock Purdy (Eddy Pineiro kick), 9:36. 49ers 21–14. **Drive: 10 plays, 69 yards, 4:39.**
- SF – Eddy Pineiro 25-yard field goal, 1:51. 49ers 24–14. **Drive: 12 plays, 75 yards, 5:18.**
- IND – Blake Grupe 39-yard field goal, 0:17. 49ers 24–17. **Drive: 7 plays, 44 yards, 1:34.**

**Third quarter**

- SF – Jauan Jennings 3-yard pass from Brock Purdy (Eddy Pineiro kick), 10:58. 49ers 31–17. **Drive: 8 plays, 64 yards, 4:02.**
- IND – Blake Grupe 51-yard field goal, 8:16. 49ers 31–20. **Drive: 7 plays, 33 yards, 2:42.**
- SF – Eddy Pineiro 38-yard field goal, 4:02. 49ers 34–20. **Drive: 8 plays, 49 yards, 4:14.**

**Fourth quarter**

- IND – Jonathan Taylor 1-yard run (Blake Grupe kick), 12:41. 49ers 34–27. **Drive: 12 plays, 65 yards, 6:21.**
- SF – Christian McCaffrey 9-yard pass from Brock Purdy (Eddy Pineiro kick), 7:37. 49ers 41–27. **Drive: 10 plays, 70 yards, 5:04.**
- SF – Dee Winters 74-yard interception return (Eddy Pineiro kick), 3:26. **49ers 48–27.**

**Top passers**

- SF – Brock Purdy – 25/34, 295 yards, 5 TD, INT
- IND – Philip Rivers – 23/35, 277 yards, 2 TD, INT

**Top rushers**

- SF – Christian McCaffrey – 21 rushes, 117 yards
- IND – Jonathan Taylor – 16 rushes, 46 yards, TD

**Top receivers**

- SF – George Kittle – 7 receptions, 115 yards, TD
- IND – Alec Pierce – 4 receptions, 86 yards, 2 TD

Earlier in the afternoon slate of games, the Lions' loss to the Steelers meant the 49ers clinched a playoff berth.

The 49ers' offense dominated the Colts' defense. Brock Purdy completed 25-of-34 passes for 295 yards as San Francisco totaled 440 yards of offense. Christian McCaffrey rushed 21 times for 117 yards and added six receptions for 29 yards and two touchdowns. George Kittle recorded seven receptions for 115 yards and one touchdown, and the team did not punt at any point during the blowout win against the Colts. It was the first time the 49ers beat the Colts since 2001. With the win, the 49ers finished 2–2 against the AFC South (3–2 against the AFC) and 7–2 on the road.

==== Week 17: vs. Chicago Bears ====
Week 17: Chicago Bears at San Francisco 49ers– Game summary

Quarter	1	2	3	4	Total
Bears	14	7	7	10	**38**
**49ers**	14	14	7	7	**42**

at Levi's Stadium, Santa Clara, California

- Date: December 28
- Game time: 5:20 p.m. PST
- Game weather: Sunny, 53 °F (12 °C)
- Game attendance: 71,836
- Referee: Alex Moore
- TV announcers (NBC): Mike Tirico, Cris Collinsworth and Melissa Stark
- Recap, Game Book

Game information

**First quarter**

- CHI – T. J. Edwards 34-yard interception return (Cairo Santos kick), 14:45. Bears 7–0.
- SF – Jake Tonges 1-yard pass from Brock Purdy (Eddy Pineiro kick), 10:57. Tied 7–7. **Drive: 9 plays, 65 yards, 3:48.**
- SF – Brock Purdy 10-yard run (Eddy Pineiro kick), 4:52. 49ers 14–7. **Drive: 3 plays, 66 yards, 1:21.**
- CHI – Luther Burden III 35-yard pass from Caleb Williams (Cairo Santos kick), 2:58. Tied 14–14. **Drive: 5 plays, 77 yards, 1:54.**

**Second quarter**

- SF – Christian McCaffrey 5-yard run (Eddy Pineiro kick), 13:44. 49ers 21–14. **Drive: 9 plays, 75 yards, 4:14.**
- CHI – Colston Loveland 36-yard pass from Caleb Williams (Cairo Santos kick), 12:20. Tied 21–21. **Drive: 3 plays, 65 yards, 1:24.**
- SF – Brock Purdy 3-yard run (Eddy Pineiro kick), 3:23. 49ers 28–21. **Drive: 15 plays, 72 yards, 8:57.**

**Third quarter**

- CHI – D'Andre Swift 2-yard run (Cairo Santos kick), 9:51. Tied 28–28. **Drive: 10 plays, 65 yards, 5:09.**
- SF – Kyle Juszczyk 6-yard pass from Brock Purdy (Eddy Pineiro kick), 4:52. 49ers 35–28. **Drive: 8 plays, 65 yards, 4:59.**

**Fourth quarter**

- CHI – D'Andre Swift 22-yard run (Cairo Santos kick), 14:54. Tied 35–35. **Drive: 10 plays, 80 yards, 4:58.**
- CHI – Cairo Santos 29-yard field goal, 5:22. Bears 38–35. **Drive: 11 plays, 78 yards, 6:01.**
- SF – Jauan Jennings 38-yard pass from Brock Purdy (Eddy Pineiro kick), 2:15. 49ers 42–38. **Drive: 7 plays, 75 yards, 3:07.**

**Top passers**

- CHI – Caleb Williams – 25/42, 330 yards, 2 TD
- SF – Brock Purdy – 24/33, 303 yards, 3 TD, INT

**Top rushers**

- CHI – D'Andre Swift – 9 rushes, 54 yards, 2 TD
- SF – Christian McCaffrey – 23 rushes, 140 yards, TD

**Top receivers**

- CHI – Luther Burden III – 8 receptions, 138 yards, TD
- SF – Ricky Pearsall – 5 receptions, 85 yards

The Bears and 49ers engaged in a shootout, with the game decided on the final play when Bears quarterback Caleb Williams’ last-ditch pass to wide receiver Jahdae Walker fell incomplete in the end zone from San Francisco's 2-yard line, sealing the 49ers’ victory. With the win, the 49ers improved to 12–4 (8–2 against the NFC), putting them one win away from clinching the NFC West title, a first-round bye, and home-field advantage throughout the entire NFL playoffs as the NFC's No. 1 seed.

==== Week 18: vs. Seattle Seahawks ====
Week 18: Seattle Seahawks at San Francisco 49ers – Game summary

Quarter	1	2	3	4	Total
**Seahawks**	7	3	0	3	**13**
49ers	0	3	0	0	**3**

at Levi's Stadium, Santa Clara, California

- Date: January 3
- Game time: 5:00 p.m. PST
- Game weather: Mostly cloudy, 57 °F (14 °C)
- Game attendance: 71,836
- Referee: Bill Vinovich
- TV announcers (ESPN/ABC): Joe Buck, Troy Aikman, Lisa Salters and Laura Rutledge
- Recap, Game Book

Game information

**First quarter**

- SEA – Zach Charbonnet 27-yard run (Jason Myers kick), 4:29. Seahawks 7–0. **Drive: 3 plays, 35 yards, 1:23.**

**Second quarter**

- SEA – Jason Myers 45-yard field goal, 5:19. Seahawks 10–0. **Drive: 9 plays, 33 yards, 4:16.**
- SF – Eddy Pineiro 48-yard field goal, 1:06. Seahawks 10–3. **Drive: 9 plays, 30 yards, 4:13.**

**Third quarter**

- No scoring plays

**Fourth quarter**

- SEA – Jason Myers 31-yard field goal, 14:15. Seahawks 13–3. **Drive: 11 plays, 55 yards, 5:16.**

**Top passers**

- SEA – Sam Darnold – 20/26, 198 yards
- SF – Brock Purdy – 19/27, 127 yards, INT

**Top rushers**

- SEA – Kenneth Walker III – 16 rushes, 97 yards
- SF – Christian McCaffrey – 8 rushes, 23 yards

**Top receivers**

- SEA – Jaxon Smith-Njigba – 6 receptions, 84 yards
- SF – Jauan Jennings – 4 receptions, 35 yards

The 49ers' high-powered offense was stuffed by the Seahawks defense, being limited to 173 total yards, their fewest in any regular-season game under head coach Kyle Shanahan. With the loss, the 49ers dropped to 12–5, finishing 9–3 against the NFC (4–2 against the NFC West), and 5–3 at home. They were also denied the division title, a first-round bye, and home-field advantage through Super Bowl 60.

With the Rams defeating the Cardinals the following day, the 49ers fell to the sixth seed and were scheduled to face the Eagles in the Wild Card Round.

=== Standings ===
==== Division ====
NFC West
	W	L	T	PCT	DIV	CONF	PF	PA	STK
^{(1)} Seattle Seahawks	14	3	0	.824	4–2	9–3	483	292	W7
^{(5)} Los Angeles Rams	12	5	0	.706	4–2	7–5	518	346	W1
^{(6)} San Francisco 49ers	12	5	0	.706	4–2	9–3	437	371	L1
Arizona Cardinals	3	14	0	.176	0–6	3–9	355	488	L9

==== Conference ====
NFC
Seed	Team	Division	W	L	T	PCT	DIV	CONF	SOS	SOV	STK
**Division leaders**
1	Seattle Seahawks	West	14	3	0	.824	4–2	9–3	.498	.471	W7
2 (Note: Chicago finished ahead of Philadelphia based on head-to-head victory.)	Chicago Bears	North	11	6	0	.647	2–4	7–5	.458	.406	L2
3	Philadelphia Eagles	East	11	6	0	.647	3–3	8–4	.476	.455	L1
4 (Note: Carolina finished ahead of Tampa Bay and Atlanta based on head-to-head record (Carolina 3–1 to Tampa Bay 2–2 and Atlanta 1–3).)	Carolina Panthers	South	8	9	0	.471	3–3	6–6	.522	.463	L2
**Wild cards**
5 (Note: LA Rams finished ahead of San Francisco based on common games (LA Rams 9–3 to San Francisco 8–4 against: Arizona, Atlanta, Carolina, Houston, Indianapolis, Jacksonville, New Orleans, Seattle, Tampa Bay and Tennessee).)	Los Angeles Rams	West	12	5	0	.706	4–2	7–5	.526	.485	W1
6	San Francisco 49ers	West	12	5	0	.706	4–2	9–3	.498	.417	L1
7	Green Bay Packers	North	9	7	1	.559	4–2	7–4–1	.483	.431	L4
**Did not qualify for the postseason**
8 (Note: Minnesota finished ahead of Detroit based on head-to-head sweep.)	Minnesota Vikings	North	9	8	0	.529	4–2	7–5	.514	.431	W5
9	Detroit Lions	North	9	8	0	.529	2–4	6–6	.490	.428	W1
10 (Note: Tampa Bay finished ahead of Atlanta based on common games (Tampa Bay 6–6 to Atlanta 5–7 against: Arizona, Buffalo, Carolina, LA Rams, Miami, New England, New Orleans, NY Jets, San Francisco and Seattle).)	Tampa Bay Buccaneers	South	8	9	0	.471	3–3	6–6	.529	.485	W1
11	Atlanta Falcons	South	8	9	0	.471	3–3	7–5	.495	.449	W4
12	Dallas Cowboys	East	7	9	1	.441	4–2	4–7–1	.438	.311	L1
13	New Orleans Saints	South	6	11	0	.353	3–3	4–8	.495	.333	L1
14	Washington Commanders	East	5	12	0	.294	3–3	3–9	.507	.388	W1
15	New York Giants	East	4	13	0	.235	2–4	2–10	.524	.478	W2
16	Arizona Cardinals	West	3	14	0	.176	0–6	3–9	.571	.422	L9
**Tiebreakers** (Note: When breaking ties for three or more teams under the NFL's rules, they are first broken within divisions, then comparing only the highest ranked remaining team from each division.)

== Postseason ==
=== Schedule ===
Round	Date	Opponent (seed)	Result	Record	Venue	Sources
Wild Card	January 11	at Philadelphia Eagles (3)	W 23–19	1–0	Lincoln Financial Field	Recap
Divisional	January 17	at Seattle Seahawks (1)	L 6–41	1–1	Lumen Field	Recap

=== Game summaries ===
==== NFC Wild Card Playoffs: at (3) Philadelphia Eagles ====
NFC Wild Card Playoffs: (6) San Francisco 49ers at (3) Philadelphia Eagles – Game summary

Quarter	1	2	3	4	Total
49ers	7	3	0	13	23
Eagles	6	7	3	3	19

at Lincoln Financial Field, Philadelphia, Pennsylvania

- Date: January 11, 2026
- Game time: 4:40 p.m. EST/1:40 p.m. PST
- Game weather: Cloudy, 46 °F (8 °C)
- Game attendance: 69,879
- Referee: Alan Eck
- TV announcers (Fox): Kevin Burkhardt, Tom Brady, Erin Andrews, and Tom Rinaldi
- Recap, Game Book

Game information

First quarter

- SF – Demarcus Robinson 2-yard pass from Brock Purdy (Eddy Pineiro kick), 11:51. 49ers 7–0. Drive: 6 plays, 76 yards, 3:09.
- PHI – Dallas Goedert 1-yard run (kick failed), 6:16. 49ers 7–6. Drive: 10 plays, 63 yards, 5:35.

Second quarter

- PHI – Dallas Goedert 9-yard pass from Jalen Hurts (Jake Elliott kick), 6:08. Eagles 13–7. Drive: 16 plays, 94 yards, 9:00.
- SF – Eddy Pineiro 36-yard field goal, 2:50. Eagles 13–10. Drive: 6 plays, 59 yards, 3:18.

Third quarter

- PHI – Jake Elliott 41-yard field goal, 2:11. Eagles 16–10. Drive: 10 plays, 23 yards, 5:11.

Fourth quarter

- SF – Christian McCaffrey 29-yard pass from Jauan Jennings (Eddy Pineiro kick), 14:52. 49ers 17–16. Drive: 5 plays, 67 yards, 2:19.
- PHI – Jake Elliott 33-yard field goal, 8:00. Eagles 19–17. Drive: 8 plays, 47 yards, 3:55.
- SF – Christian McCaffrey 4-yard pass from Brock Purdy (kick failed), 2:54. 49ers 23–19. Drive: 10 plays, 66 yards, 5:06.

Top passers

- SF – Brock Purdy – 18/31, 262 yards, 2 TD, 2 INT
- PHI – Jalen Hurts – 20/35, 168 yards, TD

Top rushers

- SF – Christian McCaffrey – 15 rushes, 48 yards
- PHI – Saquon Barkley – 26 rushes, 106 yards

Top receivers

- SF – Demarcus Robinson – 6 receptions, 111 yards, TD
- PHI – Devonta Smith – 8 receptions, 70 yards

With the upset win, the 49ers earned their third Wild-Card victory in 5 years, and defeated the Eagles in the postseason for the first time since 1996. Unfortunately for San Francisco, tight end George Kittle left the game in the second quarter with what was later revealed to be a season-ending Achilles tear.

==== NFC Divisional Playoffs: at (1) Seattle Seahawks ====
NFC Divisional Playoffs: (6) San Francisco 49ers at (1) Seattle Seahawks – Game summary

Quarter	1	2	3	4	Total
49ers	0	6	0	0	6
Seahawks	17	7	10	7	41

at Lumen Field, Seattle, Washington

- Date: January 17, 2026
- Game time: 5:15 p.m. PST
- Game weather: Clear, 46 °F (8 °C)
- Game attendance: 68,579
- Referee: John Hussey
- TV announcers (Fox): Kevin Burkhardt, Tom Brady, Erin Andrews and Tom Rinaldi
- Recap, Game Book

Game information

First quarter

- SEA – Rashid Shaheed 95-yard kickoff return (Jason Myers kick), 14:47. Seahawks 7–0.
- SEA – Jason Myers 31-yard field goal, 5:06. Seahawks 10–0. Drive: 11 plays, 44 yards, 6:10.
- SEA – Jaxon Smith-Njigba 4-yard pass from Sam Darnold (Jason Myers kick), 1:50. Seahawks 17–0. Drive: 5 plays, 42 yards, 2:27.

Second quarter

- SF – Eddy Pineiro 40-yard field goal, 11:58. Seahawks 17–3. Drive: 10 plays, 43 yards, 4:52.
- SF – Eddy Pineiro 56-yard field goal, 4:32. Seahawks 17–6. Drive: 10 plays, 57 yards, 5:40.
- SEA – Kenneth Walker III 7-yard run (Jason Myers kick), 0:31. Seahawks 24–6. Drive: 10 plays, 80 yards, 4:01.

Third quarter

- SEA – Jason Myers 24-yard field goal, 7:07. Seahawks 27–6. Drive: 8 plays, 36 yards, 4:59.
- SEA – Kenneth Walker III 15-yard run (Jason Myers kick), 2:23. Seahawks 34–6. Drive: 6 plays, 47 yards, 3:46.

Fourth quarter

- SEA – Kenneth Walker III 6-yard run (Jason Myers kick), 12:43. Seahawks 41–6. Drive: 5 plays, 37 yards, 2:58.

Top passers

- SF – Brock Purdy – 15/27, 140 yards, INT
- SEA – Sam Darnold – 12/17, 124 yards, TD

Top rushers

- SF – Brock Purdy – 5 rushes, 37 yards
- SEA – Kenneth Walker III – 19 rushes, 116 yards, 3 TD

Top receivers

- SF – Jake Tonges – 5 receptions, 59 yards
- SEA – Cooper Kupp – 5 receptions, 60 yards

With their first Divisional Round loss since 2002, the 49ers' season came to an end. This also marked their first playoff loss to the Seahawks since 2013 and their first loss in Seattle since 2021. Beginning with the Seahawks' Rashid Shaheed returning the kickoff 95 yards for a touchdown on the opening play, they were dominated in all phases of the game. The 35-point margin of defeat marked their second largest playoff loss ever in franchise history, only behind a 49–3 shellacking against the Giants in the 1986 NFC Divisional Round.
