= Jauan Jennings =

American football player (born 1997)

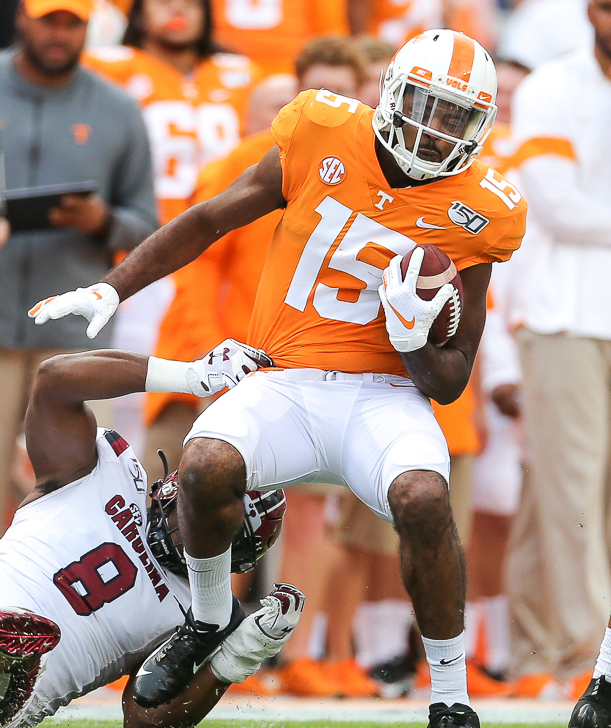
- Jennings with the Tennessee Volunteers in 2019

No. 14 – Minnesota Vikings
- Position: Wide receiver
- Roster status: Active

Personal information
- Born: July 10, 1997 (age 29); Cowan, Tennessee, U.S.
- Listed height: 6 ft 3 in (1.91 m)
- Listed weight: 212 lb (96 kg)

Career information
- High school: Blackman (Murfreesboro, Tennessee)
- College: Tennessee (2015–2019)
- NFL draft: 2020: 7th round, 217th overall pick

Career history
- San Francisco 49ers (2020–2025); Minnesota Vikings (2026–present)

Career NFL statistics as of Week 10, 2026
- Receptions: 216
- Receiving yards: 2,635
- Receiving touchdowns: 22
- Stats at Pro Football Reference

Bennie Jauan Jennings (/dʒəˈwɑːn/ jə-WAHN; born July 10, 1997) is an American professional football wide receiver for the Minnesota Vikings of the National Football League (NFL). He played college football for the Tennessee Volunteers and was selected by the San Francisco 49ers in the seventh round of the 2020 NFL draft. Jennings is one of only six non-quarterbacks to throw a touchdown pass in the Super Bowl.

== Early life ==
Jennings attended Blackman High School in Murfreesboro, Tennessee. He played quarterback in high school. A four-star recruit, Jennings committed to the University of Tennessee to play college football.

== College career ==
Jennings played at Tennessee from 2015 to 2019 under head coaches Butch Jones and Jeremy Pruitt. He converted to wide receiver in college.

In 2015, Jennings was an instant contributor. In his collegiate debut against Bowling Green, Jennings had three receptions for 56 yards in the 59–30 victory. Later on in the season, during a narrow 28–27 loss to rival Florida, he showed off his dual-threat ability when he threw a 58-yard touchdown pass to quarterback Joshua Dobbs on a trick play.

In 2016, Jennings' role in the offense expanded. He recorded his first game with over 100 receiving yards with three receptions for 111 yards and a touchdown in a 38–28 victory over Florida sealing an 18-point comeback for the Vols. The win was Tennessee's first over the Gators since the 2004 season. In the next game against rival Georgia, Jennings recorded the game-winning reception on a 43-yard Hail Mary from Dobbs to put the Vols up 34–31 with no time remaining. Jennings finished the 2016 season with 40 receptions for 580 yards and seven touchdowns.

In 2017, Jennings appeared in only one game due to a wrist injury but was dismissed from the team under interim head coach Brady Hoke later in the season. Jennings was reinstated for the next season by then-new head coach Jeremy Pruitt for the 2018 season. Jennings earned a medical redshirt for his time missed in the 2017 season.

In 2018, Jennings appeared in 11 games and recorded 30 receptions for 438 yards and three touchdowns.

In 2019, Jennings was a key contributor for the Vols during their 8–5 season. He recorded four games with at least 100 receiving yards. Jennings's best output came in a victory against South Carolina, where he had seven receptions for 174 yards and two touchdowns. Overall, Jennings finished his senior season with 59 receptions for 969 yards and eight touchdowns.

Jennings finished his collegiate career with 146 receptions for 2,153 yards and 18 touchdowns.

== Professional career ==
Pre-draft measurables
| Height | Weight | Arm length | Hand span | Wingspan | 40-yard dash | 10-yard split | 20-yard split | Vertical jump | Broad jump |
|---|---|---|---|---|---|---|---|---|---|
| 6 ft 3 1/8 in (1.91 m) | 215 lb (98 kg) | 31 5/8 in (0.80 m) | 9 in (0.23 m) | 6 ft 4 1/4 in (1.94 m) | 4.72 s | 1.58 s | 2.74 s | 29.0 in (0.74 m) | 9 ft 11 in (3.02 m) |
All values from NFL Combine

=== San Francisco 49ers ===
==== 2020 season ====
Jennings was selected by the San Francisco 49ers in the seventh round (217th overall) of the 2020 NFL draft. He was waived on September 5, but was signed to the practice squad the next day. Jennings was placed on the practice squad/injured list on October 24. He signed a reserve/future contract on January 4, 2021.

==== 2021 season ====
Over the course of the 2021 season, Jennings established himself as the 49ers third wideout. Jennings scored his first NFL touchdown in Week 2 against the Philadelphia Eagles, and by the end of November had become an integral part of the offense. Over the final five weeks of the 2021 season, Jennings recorded 16 receptions for 212 yards and three touchdowns, including six receptions for 94 yards and two touchdowns in a must-win week 18 matchup against the Los Angeles Rams. His production continued in the playoffs, with Jennings recording at least one reception in each round before the 49ers lost to the Rams in the NFC Championship Game.

==== 2022 season ====
In the 2022 season, Jennings appeared in 16 games, of which he started four. He finished the season with 35 receptions for 416 yards and a touchdown.

==== 2023 season ====
On February 28, 2023, the 49ers placed an exclusive-rights tender on Jennings, which he signed in April. In the 2023 season, Jennings appeared in 13 games and started two. He had 19 receptions for 265 yards and one touchdown. During Super Bowl LVIII against the Kansas City Chiefs, Jennings caught four passes for 42 yards and a touchdown and also threw a 21-yard touchdown pass to Christian McCaffrey in the 25–22 overtime loss. Jennings became the second player in Super Bowl history to throw for a touchdown and catch a touchdown, joining Nick Foles in Super Bowl LII.

==== 2024 season ====
On March 11, 2024, the 49ers placed a tender on Jennings. On May 29, he signed a two-year, $15.4 million contract extension with the 49ers.

During Week 3, Jennings had 11 receptions for 175 yards and three touchdowns in a 27–24 road loss to the Los Angeles Rams. As a result of injuries sustained by several of the 49ers' most productive pass catchers, Jennings emerged as the team's leading wide receiver in 2024, catching a career-high 77 passes for 975 yards and six touchdowns. However, he was prevented from achieving his first-ever 1,000-yard season after getting ejected midway through a Week 18 game against the Arizona Cardinals.

==== 2025 season ====
During the 2025 offseason and entering the final year of his contract, Jennings requested the 49ers trade him due to both sides failing to agree on a contract extension. In August 2025, 49ers general manager, John Lynch, announced he would not trade Jennings. Though the 49ers and Jennings did not come to an agreement on a contract extension, they agreed to a contract restructure that would increase the ceiling of his 2025 salary to $10.5 million by incorporating $3 million worth of play-time incentives on September 3.

Following the Cleveland Browns' Week 13 loss to the 49ers, Cleveland defensive tackle Shelby Harris criticized Jennings in a post-game interview. Harris accused Jennings of saying things during the game that "crossed the line" and referred to him with a derogatory term while defending the reaction of Carolina Panthers players during a prior on-field altercation. He finished the 2025 season with 55 receptions for 643 yards and nine touchdowns.

During the Wild Card Round win over the Philadelphia Eagles, Jennings threw a touchdown pass to Christian McCaffrey on a trick play. Jennings became the first wide receiver in NFL history to have multiple passing touchdowns in a playoff career.

=== Minnesota Vikings ===
==== 2026 season ====
On May 7, 2026, Jennings signed a one-year contract worth up to $13 million with the Minnesota Vikings.

== Career statistics ==
Legend
| **Bold** | Career high |

=== NFL ===
==== Regular season ====
| Year | Team | Games | | Receiving | | | | | Fumbles | |
| Year | Team | GP | GS | Rec | Yds | Avg | Lng | TD | Fum | Lost |
|---|---|---|---|---|---|---|---|---|---|---|
| 2020 | SF | 0 | 0 | DNP | | | | | | |
| 2021 | SF | 16 | 1 | 24 | 282 | 11.8 | 34 | 5 | **1** | 0 |
| 2022 | SF | 16 | 4 | 35 | 416 | 11.9 | 44 | 1 | **1** | 0 |
| 2023 | SF | 13 | 2 | 19 | 265 | **13.9** | 31 | 1 | 0 | 0 |
| 2024 | SF | 15 | 10 | **77** | **975** | 12.7 | **45** | 6 | **1** | 0 |
| 2025 | SF | 15 | 15 | 55 | 643 | 11.7 | 42 | **9** | **1** | **1** |
| 2026 | MIN | 6 | 2 | 6 | 54 | 9.0 | 20 | 0 | 0 | 0 |
| Career | | 81 | 34 | 216 | 2,635 | 12.2 | 45 | 22 | 4 | 1 |

==== Postseason ====
| Year | Team | Games | | Receiving | | | | | Fumbles | |
| Year | Team | GP | GS | Rec | Yds | Avg | Lng | TD | Fum | Lost |
|---|---|---|---|---|---|---|---|---|---|---|
| 2021 | SF | 3 | 0 | 6 | 43 | 7.2 | 13 | 0 | 0 | 0 |
| 2022 | SF | 3 | 0 | 4 | 67 | 16.8 | 33 | 0 | 0 | 0 |
| 2023 | SF | 3 | 0 | **10** | **111** | 11.1 | 23 | **1** | 0 | 0 |
| 2025 | SF | 2 | 2 | 3 | 68 | **22.7** | **45** | 0 | 0 | 0 |
| Career | | 11 | 2 | 23 | 289 | 12.6 | 45 | 1 | 0 | 0 |

=== College ===
College statistics
| Year | Receiving | | | | | Rushing | | | |
| Year | G | Rec | Yds | Avg | TD | Att | Yds | Avg | TD |
|---|---|---|---|---|---|---|---|---|---|
| 2015 | 10 | 14 | 149 | 10.6 | 0 | 7 | 15 | 2.1 | 0 |
| 2016 | 13 | 40 | 580 | 14.5 | 7 | 5 | 27 | **5.4** | 0 |
| 2017 | 1 | 3 | 17 | 5.7 | 0 | 0 | 0 | 0.0 | 0 |
| 2018 | 11 | 30 | 438 | 14.6 | 3 | 0 | 0 | 0.0 | 0 |
| 2019 | 13 | **59** | **969** | **16.4** | **8** | **13** | **51** | 3.9 | **1** |
| Career | 48 | 146 | 2,153 | 14.7 | 18 | 25 | 93 | 3.7 | 1 |
