= Jake Tonges =

American football player (born 1999)

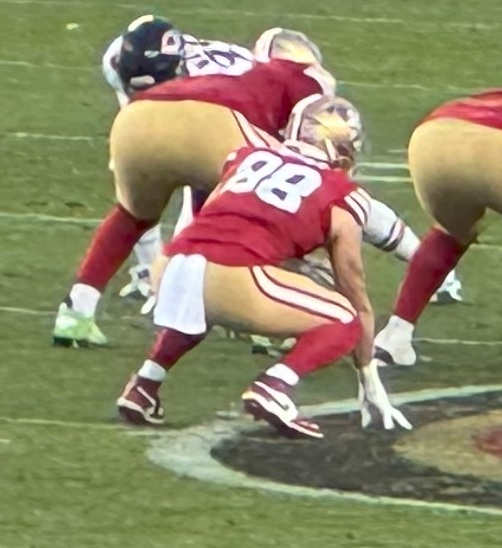
- Tonges with the San Francisco 49ers in 2024

No. 88 – San Francisco 49ers
- Position: Tight end
- Roster status: Injured reserve

Personal information
- Born: July 8, 1999 (age 27); Cincinnati, Ohio, U.S.
- Listed height: 6 ft 4 in (1.93 m)
- Listed weight: 240 lb (109 kg)

Career information
- High school: Los Gatos (Los Gatos, California)
- College: California (2017–2021)
- NFL draft: 2022: undrafted

Career history
- Chicago Bears (2022); San Francisco 49ers (2023–present)

Career NFL statistics as of 2025
- Receptions: 34
- Receiving yards: 293
- Receiving touchdowns: 5
- Stats at Pro Football Reference

Jacob Tonges (/ˈtɔːndʒʌs/ TAWN-jus; born July 8, 1999) is an American professional football tight end for the San Francisco 49ers of the National Football League (NFL). He played college football for the California Golden Bears and signed with the Chicago Bears as an undrafted free agent in 2022.

== Early life ==
Tonges was born on July 8, 1999, in Cincinnati, Ohio and moved to Los Gatos, California with his family when he was five years old. He is the son of Tim Tonges and Erika Tonges. He attended Los Gatos High School, originally starting out as a quarterback his freshman and sophomore year, before transitioning into a two-way player, becoming a tight end and defensive back. Tonges received offers from various schools such as Sacramento State, Columbia, and many others, but decided to walk-on at the University of California, Berkeley.

== College career ==
At the University of California, Tonges was a member of the California Golden Bears for five seasons, redshirting his true freshman year. As a redshirt senior, he caught 22 passes for 278 yards and two touchdowns. Tonges finished his collegiate career with 47 receptions for 620 yards and four touchdowns.

== Professional career ==
Pre-draft measurables
| Height | Weight | Arm length | Hand span | Wingspan | 40-yard dash | 10-yard split | 20-yard split | 20-yard shuttle | Three-cone drill | Vertical jump | Broad jump | Bench press |
|---|---|---|---|---|---|---|---|---|---|---|---|---|
| 6 ft 4 3/8 in (1.94 m) | 240 lb (109 kg) | 32 3/4 in (0.83 m) | 10 in (0.25 m) | 6 ft 7 1/8 in (2.01 m) | 4.77 s | 1.62 s | 2.72 s | 4.45 s | 7.09 s | 35.5 in (0.90 m) | 10 ft 0 in (3.05 m) | 17 reps |
All values from Pro Day

=== Chicago Bears ===
Tonges signed with the Chicago Bears as an undrafted free agent on April 30, 2022. He made the Bears' initial 53-man roster out of training camp. Tonges was waived on November 10, and re-signed to the practice squad. He signed a reserve/future contract with Chicago on January 9, 2023.

On August 8, 2023, Tonges was placed on injured reserve after clearing waivers. He was waived nine days later.

=== San Francisco 49ers ===
On September 27, 2023, Tonges signed with the San Francisco 49ers' practice squad. He signed a reserve/future contract with the 49ers on February 13, 2024.

On April 17, 2025, Tonges re-signed with the 49ers. His 2025 season saw an increased role in San Fransico's offense, partly due to injuries to tight end George Kittle. On September 7, he recorded his first career reception and his first career touchdown, which turned out to be the game winner, in a 17–13 road victory over the Seattle Seahawks. Tonges finished his breakout season with 34 receptions for 293 yards and five touchdowns. In addition to his receiving performance, his run-blocking grade (74.4) ranked fifth-highest in the NFL among the tight end position for the 2025 season according to Pro Football Focus.

On March 12, 2026, Tonges re-signed with San Francisco on a two-year, $8 million contract, with $3.5 million guaranteed. On September 16, Tonges was placed on injured reserve due to a knee injury suffered in the team's season opener against the Los Angeles Rams. Shortly thereafter, it was announced that Tonges would require season–ending surgery to repair an MCL tear in his knee.

== NFL career statistics ==
Legend
| **Bold** | Career high |

=== Regular season ===
| Year | Team | Games | | Receiving | | | | | Rushing | | | | | Fumbles | |
| Year | Team | GP | GS | Rec | Yds | Avg | Lng | TD | Att | Yds | Avg | Lng | TD | Fum | Lost |
|---|---|---|---|---|---|---|---|---|---|---|---|---|---|---|---|
| 2022 | CHI | 4 | 0 | 0 | 0 | 0.0 | 0 | 0 | 0 | 0 | 0.0 | 0 | 0 | 0 | 0 |
| 2024 | SF | 16 | 0 | 0 | 0 | 0.0 | 0 | 0 | 0 | 0 | 0.0 | 0 | 0 | 0 | 0 |
| 2025 | SF | **17** | **2** | **34** | **293** | **8.6** | **23** | **5** | 0 | 0 | 0.0 | 0 | 0 | 0 | 0 |
| Career | | 37 | 2 | 34 | 293 | 8.6 | 23 | 5 | 0 | 0 | 0.0 | 0 | 0 | 0 | 0 |

=== Postseason ===
| Year | Team | Games | | Receiving | | | | | Rushing | | | | | Fumbles | |
| Year | Team | GP | GS | Rec | Yds | Avg | Lng | TD | Att | Yds | Avg | Lng | TD | Fum | Lost |
|---|---|---|---|---|---|---|---|---|---|---|---|---|---|---|---|
| 2025 | SF | 2 | 1 | 6 | 73 | 12.2 | 16 | 0 | 0 | 0 | 0.0 | 0 | 0 | 1 | 1 |
| Career | | 2 | 1 | 6 | 73 | 12.2 | 16 | 0 | 0 | 0 | 0.0 | 0 | 0 | 1 | 1 |
