= Jalen Graham =

American football player (born 2001)

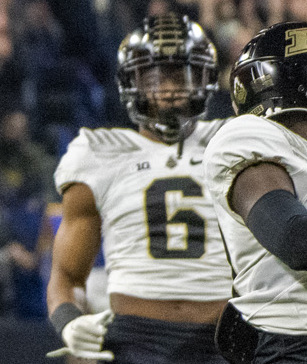
- Graham with the Purdue Boilermakers in 2022

No. 41 – San Francisco 49ers
- Position: Linebacker
- Roster status: Practice squad

Personal information
- Born: January 11, 2001 (age 25); Detroit, Michigan, U.S.
- Listed height: 6 ft 3 in (1.91 m)
- Listed weight: 220 lb (100 kg)

Career information
- High school: Cass Tech (Detroit)
- College: Purdue (2019–2022)
- NFL draft: 2023: 7th round, 255th overall pick

Career history
- San Francisco 49ers (2023); Washington Commanders (2024)*; San Francisco 49ers (2024–present)
- * Offseason or practice squad member only

Career NFL statistics as of 2025
- Tackles: 10
- Stats at Pro Football Reference

Jalen A. Graham (born January 11, 2001) is an American professional football linebacker for the San Francisco 49ers of the National Football League (NFL). He played college football for the Purdue Boilermakers and was selected by the San Francisco 49ers in the seventh round of the 2023 NFL draft. Graham has also been a member of the Washington Commanders.

== Early life ==
Graham was born on January 11, 2001, in Detroit, Michigan. He attended Detroit Country Day School for his freshman and sophomore years, before transferring to Cass Tech High School. He played quarterback and defensive back, being named first-team all-state at the latter position as a senior. A three-star recruit, Graham committed to play college football for the Purdue Boilermakers as a defensive back.

== College career ==
Graham saw immediate playing time as a true freshman in 2019, playing in 11 games and starting eight while recording 37 tackles and 2.5 tackles-for-loss. He appeared in five games in 2020, posting 16 tackles, two fumble recoveries and one forced fumble. Graham started 13 games in 2021, tallying 64 tackles, two interceptions, seven pass breakups and a sack. He was named honorable mention All-Big Ten Conference for his performance.

As a senior, Graham appeared in only nine games due to injury but still managed to post 52 tackles, second-best on the team, five tackles-for-loss, one sack and one interception. Despite having remaining eligibility due to the COVID-19 pandemic, he opted to declare for the NFL draft, finishing his stint at Purdue with 169 tackles, 12.5 tackles-for-loss, three forced fumbles and 13 pass breakups in 38 games.

== Professional career ==
Pre-draft measurables
| Height | Weight | Arm length | Hand span | Wingspan | 40-yard dash | 10-yard split | 20-yard split | 20-yard shuttle | Three-cone drill | Vertical jump | Broad jump | Bench press |
|---|---|---|---|---|---|---|---|---|---|---|---|---|
| 6 ft 1 7/8 in (1.88 m) | 220 lb (100 kg) | 33 in (0.84 m) | 9 7/8 in (0.25 m) | 6 ft 6 3/4 in (2.00 m) | 4.64 s | 1.68 s | 2.72 s | 4.46 s | 7.31 s | 31.5 in (0.80 m) | 9 ft 6 in (2.90 m) | 18 reps |
All values from NFL Combine/Pro Day

=== San Francisco 49ers (first stint) ===
Graham was selected by the San Francisco 49ers in the seventh round (255th overall) of the 2023 NFL draft. As a rookie, he appeared in four games and recorded one tackle. On August 27, 2024, the 49ers waived him as part of final roster cuts before the start of the 2024 season.

=== Washington Commanders ===
On August 28, 2024, Graham signed with the practice squad of the Washington Commanders.

=== San Francisco 49ers (second stint) ===
On October 1, 2024, the San Francisco 49ers signed him off the Commanders' practice squad onto their active roster. On November 5, the 49ers released Graham again and re-signed him to their practice squad two days later. On December 21, Graham was promoted to the active roster.

On April 22, 2025, Graham re-signed with the 49ers. He was waived on August 26 as part of final roster cuts and re-signed to the practice squad the next day.

On January 20, 2026, Graham signed a reserve/futures contract with San Francisco. Graham was waived by the 49ers as a part of final roster cuts on August 30; he was re-signed to the team's practice squad the following day.

== NFL career statistics ==
Legend
| **Bold** | Career high |

=== Regular season ===
| Year | Team | Games | | Tackles | | | | | Interceptions | | | | | | Fumbles | | | | |
| Year | Team | GP | GS | Cmb | Solo | Ast | Sck | TFL | Int | Yds | Avg | Lng | TD | PD | FF | Fum | FR | Yds | TD |
|---|---|---|---|---|---|---|---|---|---|---|---|---|---|---|---|---|---|---|---|
| 2023 | SF | 4 | 0 | 1 | 1 | 0 | 0.0 | 0 | 0 | 0 | 0.0 | 0 | 0 | 0 | 0 | 0 | 0 | 0 | 0 |
| 2024 | SF | **8** | 0 | **8** | **4** | **4** | 0.0 | **1** | 0 | 0 | 0.0 | 0 | 0 | 0 | 0 | 0 | 0 | 0 | 0 |
| 2025 | SF | 3 | 0 | 1 | 0 | 1 | 0.0 | 0 | 0 | 0 | 0.0 | 0 | 0 | 0 | 0 | 0 | 0 | 0 | 0 |
| Career | | 15 | 0 | 10 | 5 | 5 | 0.0 | 1 | 0 | 0 | 0.0 | 0 | 0 | 0 | 0 | 0 | 0 | 0 | 0 |

=== Postseason ===
| Year | Team | Games | | Tackles | | | | | Interceptions | | | | | | Fumbles | | | | |
| Year | Team | GP | GS | Cmb | Solo | Ast | Sck | TFL | Int | Yds | Avg | Lng | TD | PD | FF | Fum | FR | Yds | TD |
|---|---|---|---|---|---|---|---|---|---|---|---|---|---|---|---|---|---|---|---|
| 2025 | SF | 1 | 0 | 1 | 0 | 1 | 0.0 | 0 | 0 | 0 | 0.0 | 0 | 0 | 0 | 0 | 0 | 0 | 0 | 0 |
| Career | | 1 | 0 | 1 | 0 | 1 | 0.0 | 0 | 0 | 0 | 0.0 | 0 | 0 | 0 | 0 | 0 | 0 | 0 | 0 |
