= Marques Sigle =

American football player (born 2002)

No. 36 – San Francisco 49ers
- Position: Safety
- Roster status: Active

Personal information
- Born: July 18, 2002 (age 24); Omaha, Nebraska, U.S.
- Listed height: 5 ft 11 in (1.80 m)
- Listed weight: 199 lb (90 kg)

Career information
- High school: Omaha North (NE)
- College: North Dakota State (2020–2022); Kansas State (2023–2024)
- NFL draft: 2025: 5th round, 160th overall pick

Career history
- San Francisco 49ers (2025–present)

Career NFL statistics as of Week 7, 2026
- Total tackles: 78
- Sacks: 1
- Fumble recoveries: 1
- Pass deflections: 2
- Stats at Pro Football Reference

Marques Sigle (born July 18, 2002) is an American professional football safety for the San Francisco 49ers of the National Football League (NFL). He played college football for the North Dakota State Bison and Kansas State Wildcats. Sigle was selected by the 49ers in the fifth round of the 2025 NFL draft.

== Early life ==
Sigle attended Omaha North High School in Omaha, Nebraska, and committed to play college football for the North Dakota State Bison.

== College career ==
=== North Dakota State ===
As a freshman in 2020, Sigle was redshirted. In 2021, he appeared in 13 games as he helped lead the Bison to a National Championship. In 2022, Sigle had 27 tackles, two interceptions, and a touchdown for North Dakota State. After the season, he entered his name into the NCAA transfer portal.

=== Kansas State ===
Sigle decided to transfer to play for the Kansas State Wildcats. In his first season with the Wildcats in 2023, Sigle recorded 63 tackles, nine pass deflections, and an interception, earning an all-Big 12 Conference honorable mention.

Sigle finished his final collegiate season with Kansas State in 2024 with 60 tackles with 6.5 being for a loss, three pass deflections, and three interceptions. After the season, Sigle declared for the 2025 NFL draft, while also accepting an invite to participate in the 2025 East–West Shrine Bowl.

== Professional career ==
Pre-draft measurables
Height	Weight	Arm length	Hand span	Wingspan	40-yard dash	10-yard split	20-yard split	Vertical jump	Broad jump	Bench press
5 ft 11 3/8 in (1.81 m)	199 lb (90 kg)	30 3/4 in (0.78 m)	9 1/4 in (0.23 m)	6 ft 2 in (1.88 m)	4.37 s	1.50 s	2.55 s	38.0 in (0.97 m)	10 ft 10 in (3.30 m)	18 reps
All values from NFL Combine/Pro Day

=== 2025 season ===
Sigle was selected by the San Francisco 49ers in the fifth round (160th overall) of the 2025 NFL draft.

Sigle made his NFL debut during the season-opener against the Seattle Seahawks and finished the 17–13 road victory with six combined tackles (five solo) and a fumble recovery. Three weeks later against the Jacksonville Jaguars, Sigle had eight combined tackles (six solo) and a pass deflection in the 26–21 loss. In the next game against the Los Angeles Rams on Thursday Night Football, he recorded a team-high 13 combined tackles (seven solo) and a pass deflection during the 26–23 overtime road victory. Sigle did not play in Weeks 9 and 10 due to an ankle injury.

Sigle finished his rookie year with 52 combined tackles (28 solo), two pass deflections, and a fumble recovery in 15 games and starts. The 49ers finished third in the NFC West with a 12–5 record and qualified for the playoffs as the #6-seed. During the Wild Card Round against the Philadelphia Eagles, Sigle recorded eight combined tackles (seven solo) in the 23–19 road victory. In the Divisional Round against the Seahawks, he had six combined tackles (four solo) during the 41–6 road loss.

=== 2026 season ===
During a Week 2 35–13 victory over the Miami Dolphins, Sigle had seven combined tackles (three solo) and his first NFL sack. Two weeks later against the Denver Broncos, he recorded six combined tackles (four solo) before leaving the eventual 24–14 victory in the third quarter with an ankle injury.

== NFL career statistics ==
=== Regular season ===
Year	Team	Games		Tackles					Interceptions						Fumbles			
Year	Team	GP	GS	Comb	Solo	Ast	Sck	TFL	Int	Yds	Avg	Lng	TD	PD	FF	FR	Yds	TD
2025	SF	15	7	52	28	24	0.0	1	0	0	0.0	0	0	2	0	1	0	0
2026	SF	4	4	26	13	13	1.0	1	0	0	0.0	0	0	0	0	0	0	0
Career		19	11	78	41	37	1.0	2	0	0	0.0	0	0	2	0	1	0	0

=== Postseason ===
Year	Team	Games		Tackles					Interceptions						Fumbles			
Year	Team	GP	GS	Comb	Solo	Ast	Sck	TFL	Int	Yds	Avg	Lng	TD	PD	FF	FR	Yds	TD
2025	SF	2	1	14	11	3	0.0	0	0	0	0.0	0	0	0	0	0	0	0
Career		2	1	14	11	3	0.0	0	0	0	0.0	0	0	0	0	0	0	0
