= Derrick Canteen =

American football player (born 2001)

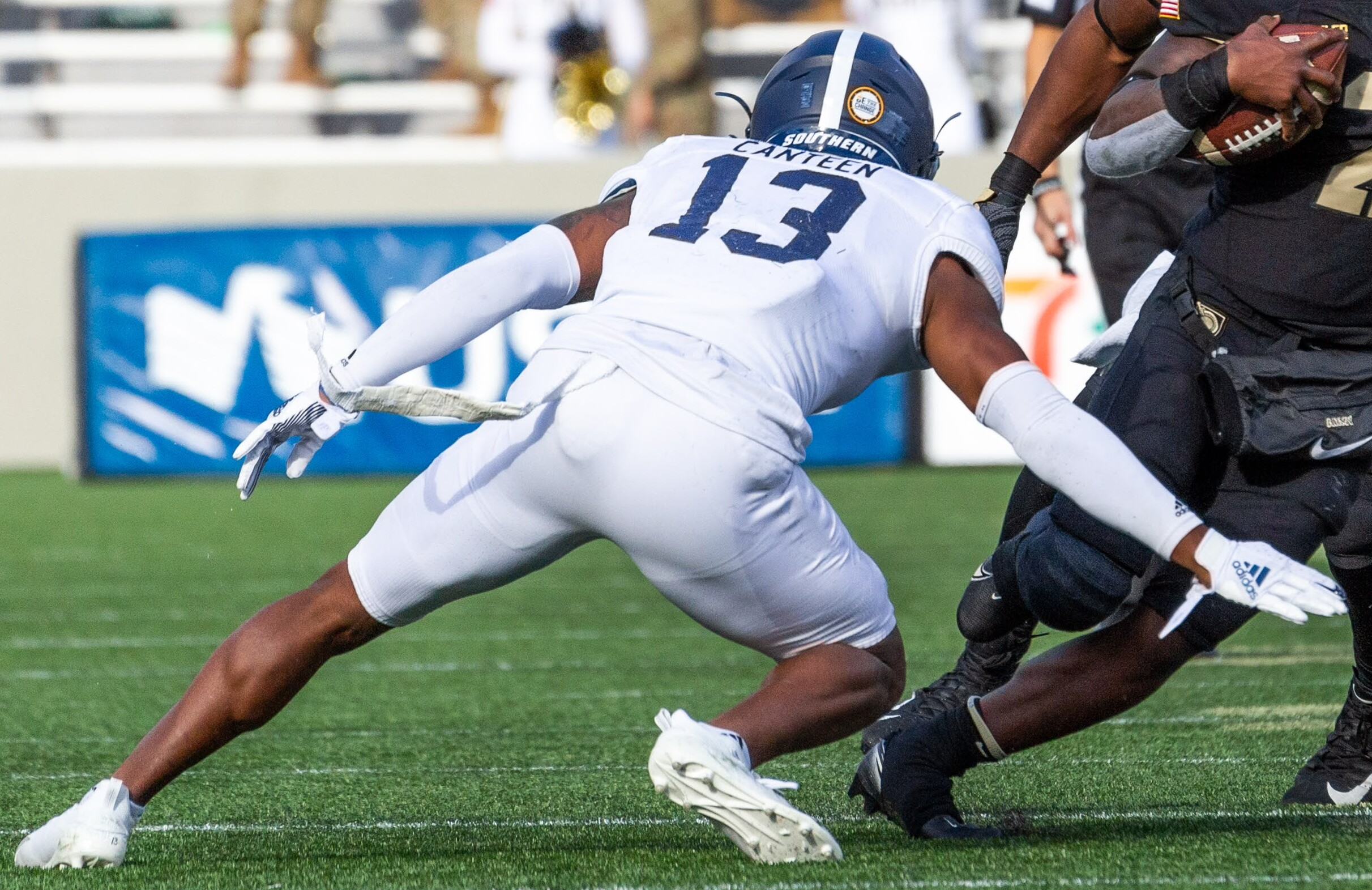
- Canteen with Georgia Southern in 2020

Profile
- Position: Cornerback

Personal information
- Born: April 2, 2001 (age 25); Killeen, Texas, U.S.
- Listed height: 5 ft 10 in (1.78 m)
- Listed weight: 193 lb (88 kg)

Career information
- High school: Evans (Evans, Georgia)
- College: Georgia Southern (2019–2023); Virginia Tech (2023); Cincinnati (2024)
- NFL draft: 2025: undrafted

Career history
- San Francisco 49ers (2025)*; Tennessee Titans (2026)*
- * Offseason or practice squad member only
- Stats at Pro Football Reference

Derrick Trevon Canteen (born April 2, 2001) is an American professional football cornerback. He played college football for the Georgia Southern Eagles, Virginia Tech Hokies, and Cincinnati Bearcats.

== Early life ==
Canteen was born in 2001 as one of two children to Bridgett and Derrick Canteen in Killeen, Texas. He played high school football as a cornerback with the Evans Knights. In his junior year, Canteen's performance included four interceptions, including one returned for a touchdown, 14 pass breakups, one fumble recovery and 46 tackles. These contributions aided the Evans Knights to a regional championship. By the end of his high school career, Canteen earned several All-Regional, First Team selection and Player of the Year accolades. Canteen was rated a two-star recruiting prospect by 247Sports.com and received a total of nine collegiate scholarship offers before completing his early enrollment in 2018. He graduated high school the following year.

== College career ==
=== Georgia Southern ===
After completing early enrollment in 2018, Canteen joined the Georgia Southern Eagles in 2019 as a redshirt freshman. He played defensive back in four games as a member of special teams. For the 2020–2021 season, Canteen played and started in all 13 games, earning the Freshman All-American Team and first-team All-Sun Belt Conference selection honors. During the 2021–2022 season, Canteen played starting defensive back for two games before missing the remaining season games due to pectoral surgery. He returned for the 2022–2023 season during which he started 10 of 11 total games, finishing with 64 total tackles, including a sack and two tackles for loss, 12 pass breakups and one interception. His performance earned him Third-Team All-Sun Belt selection and Fourth-Team All-Conference honors. While in college, Canteen majored in interdisciplinary studies.

=== Virginia Tech ===
Canteen transferred to Virginia Tech for the 2023 season in which he joined the Hokies as a cornerback. He started in three of the total 13 games, finishing with 43 total tackles, including 23 solo tackles, one interception and five pass breakups on six passes and one forced fumble.

=== University of Cincinnati ===
In 2024, Canteen transferred to the University of Cincinnati. He joined the Bearcats as a safety, starting in all 12 games in which he recorded a total of 44 tackles including three tackles for loss, five pass breakups, one interception, and one forced fumble. Canteen also served as team captain.

== Professional career ==
Pre-draft measurables
| Height | Weight | Arm length | Hand span | Wingspan | 40-yard dash | 10-yard split | 20-yard split | 20-yard shuttle | Three-cone drill | Vertical jump | Broad jump | Bench press |
|---|---|---|---|---|---|---|---|---|---|---|---|---|
| 5 ft 10 1/4 in (1.78 m) | 193 lb (88 kg) | 29 7/8 in (0.76 m) | 9 in (0.23 m) | 6 ft 1 1/8 in (1.86 m) | 4.63 s | 1.63 s | 2.65 s | 4.10 s | 7.00 s | 30.5 in (0.77 m) | 9 ft 9 in (2.97 m) | 17 reps |
All values from Pro Day

=== San Francisco 49ers ===
On May 13, 2025, Canteen was signed by the San Francisco 49ers to a three-year deal following the 2025 NFL Draft. He was later released on September 24 before being re-signed on October 2 as a member of the practice squad. On January 20, 2026, Canteen signed a reserve/futures contract with San Francisco. On July 31, Canteen was waived by the 49ers.

=== Tennessee Titans ===
On August 2, 2026, Canteen signed with the Tennessee Titans. He was waived by Tennessee as a part of final roster cuts on August 30, but re–signed with the team's practice squad the next day. On September 2, the Titans waived Canteen from the practice squad. On October 6, Canteen was re-signed to the practice squad. He was released on November 9.

== Personal life ==
Canteen began hosting an annual youth football camp in the Central Savannah River Area in 2021.

Canteen has one sister named Alayah.
