= 2026 San Francisco 49ers season =

77th season in franchise history

- Owner: Jed York
- General manager: John Lynch
- President: Al Guido
- Head coach: Kyle Shanahan
- Offensive coordinator: Klay Kubiak
- Defensive coordinator: Raheem Morris
- Home stadium: Levi's Stadium

Results
- Record: 8–1
- Division place: 1st NFC West

Uniform
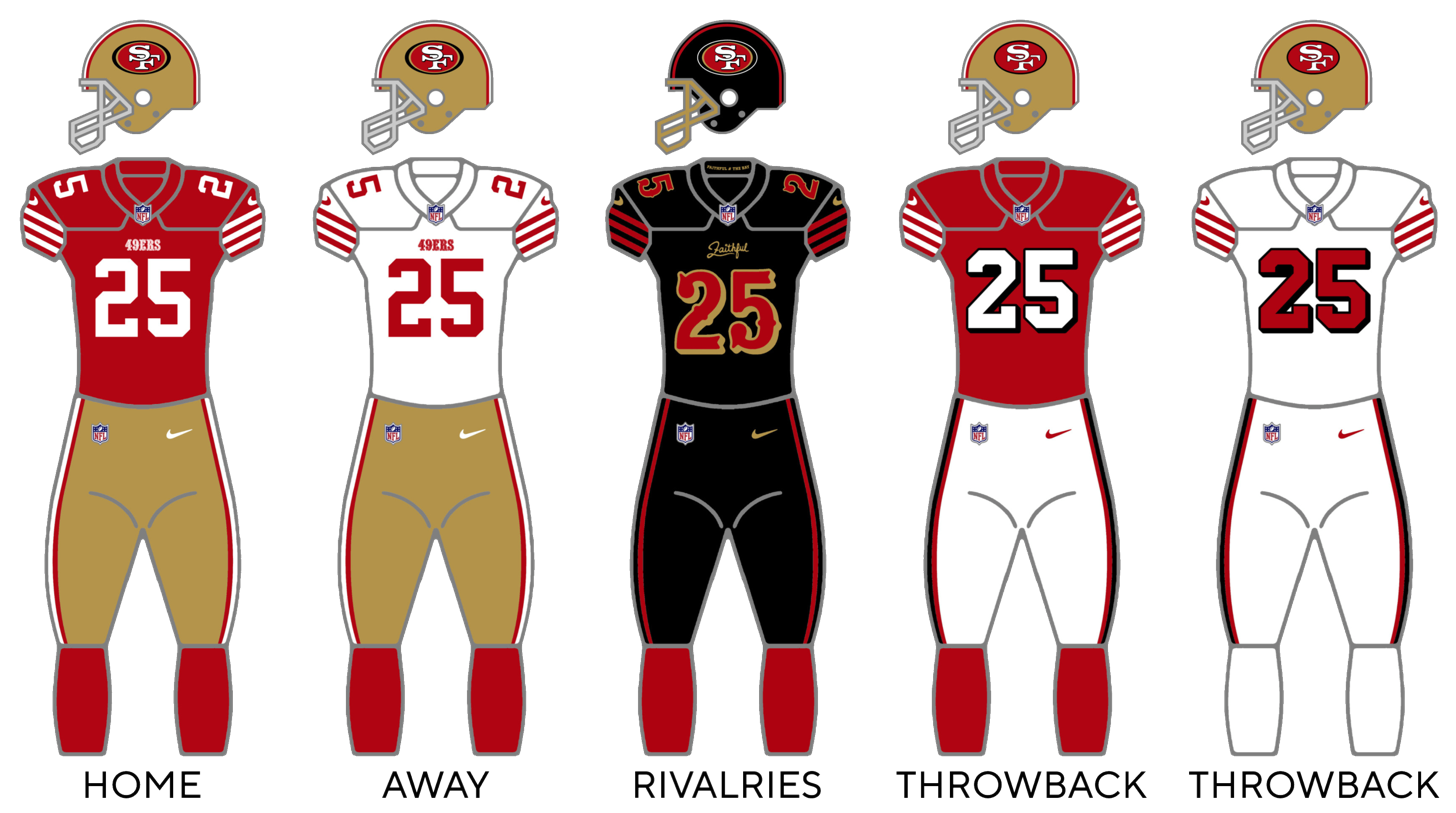

The 2026 season is the San Francisco 49ers' 77th in the National Football League (NFL), their 81st overall, their 13th playing their home games at Levi's Stadium, and their tenth under the tandem of general manager John Lynch and head coach Kyle Shanahan. The 49ers will attempt to improve upon their 12–5 record from the previous season, make the playoffs for the second consecutive season, and reclaim the NFC West title. The 49ers will travel the greatest distance in 2026, with a total of 38,105 miles in the regular season. This includes their Week 1 game in Australia, which was a road game against the Rams, and their Week 11 game in Mexico City; a designated home game against the Vikings.

The 49ers would go 3–0 for the second consecutive season after a win against the Arizona Cardinals in week 3, the second time this has occurred in franchise history with the first occurring between their 1989 and 1990 seasons respectively. The following week, the 49ers would go 4–0 after a home win against the Denver Broncos in week 4, becoming the sixth season in franchise history with such a start following 2023. In Week 5, a road win against division rival and the defending Super Bowl champion Seattle Seahawks advanced the 49ers to 5–0 for the fifth time in the Super Bowl era. In Week 6, the 49ers' victory over the Washington Commanders would advance them to 6–0 for their fourth time since joining the NFL, and the first start with at least as many wins since 2019.

The club reached a milestone 700 lifetime wins encompassing regular season and playoffs in their 46–40 win over the Dallas Cowboys.

== Offseason ==
=== Coaching changes ===
2026 San Francisco 49ers coaching staff changes
Position	Previous coach(es)	Vacancy reason	Replacement(s)	Source(s)
Defensive coordinator	Robert Saleh, 2025	Hired by Tennessee	Raheem Morris	
Assistant head coach/defense	Gus Bradley, 2025	Hired by Tennessee	Matt Eberflus	
Defensive backs coach	Daniel Bullocks, 2023	Hired by Green Bay	Jerry Gray	
Tight ends coach	Brian Fleury, 2022	Hired by Seattle	Cameron Clemmons	

=== Roster changes ===
==== Free agency ====
The 49ers entered free agency with the following:

Position	Player	Free agency tag	Date signed	2026 team	Notes
DE	Yetur Gross-Matos	UFA			
WR	Jauan Jennings	UFA	May 7, 2026	Minnesota Vikings	Signed one-year contract
DT	Jordan Elliott	UFA	March 12, 2026	Tennessee Titans	Signed two-year contract
G	Spencer Burford	UFA	March 17, 2026	Las Vegas Raiders	Signed one-year contract
S	Jason Pinnock	UFA	March 16, 2026	New York Giants	Signed one-year contract
DT	Kevin Givens	UFA	July 26, 2026	San Francisco 49ers	Signed one-year contract
LB	Luke Gifford	UFA	March 14, 2026	San Francisco 49ers	Signed two-year contract
WR	Kendrick Bourne	UFA	March 12, 2026	Arizona Cardinals	Signed two-year contract
WR	Skyy Moore	UFA	March 13, 2026	Green Bay Packers	Signed one-year contract
LS	Jon Weeks	UFA	March 3, 2026	San Francisco 49ers	Signed one-year contract
G	Ben Bartch	UFA	March 25, 2026	Detroit Lions	Signed one-year contract
RB	Brian Robinson Jr.	UFA	March 26, 2026	Atlanta Falcons	Signed one-year contract
P	Thomas Morstead	UFA			
C	Matt Hennessy	UFA	March 13, 2026	Dallas Cowboys	Signed one-year contract
WR	Trent Taylor	UFA			Retired
RB	Patrick Taylor	UFA	March 24, 2026	San Francisco 49ers	Signed one-year contract
K	Eddy Piñeiro	UFA	March 11, 2026	San Francisco 49ers	Signed four-year contract
LB	Eric Kendricks	UFA			
LB	Garret Wallow	UFA	March 18, 2026	San Francisco 49ers	Signed one-year contract
DE	Clelin Ferrell	UFA	July 27, 2026	Miami Dolphins	Signed one-year contract
LB	Curtis Robinson	UFA	April 27, 2026	Dallas Cowboys	Signed one-year contract
DE	Tarron Jackson	RFA			
DE	Robert Beal Jr.	RFA	March 12, 2026	Miami Dolphins	Signed one-year contract
CB	Chase Lucas	RFA	April 10, 2026	Tampa Bay Buccaneers	Signed one-year contract
DE	Sam Okuayinonu	RFA	March 18, 2026	San Francisco 49ers	Signed one-year contract
TE	Jake Tonges	RFA	March 12, 2026	San Francisco 49ers	Signed two-year contract
G	Austen Pleasants	ERFA	April 20, 2026	San Francisco 49ers	Signed one-year contract
DT	Kalia Davis	UFA	March 19, 2026	Cleveland Browns	Signed one-year contract
RFA: Restricted free agent, UFA: Unrestricted free agent, ERFA: Exclusive rights free agent Legend – Light green background indicates a player has been re-signed by the 49ers. – Light red background indicates a player has departed the 49ers.

==== Signings ====
Position	Player	2025 team	Date signed	Notes
WR	Mike Evans	Tampa Bay Buccaneers	March 12, 2026	Signed three-year contract
T	Vederian Lowe	New England Patriots	March 12, 2026	Signed two-year contract
G	Brett Toth	Philadelphia Eagles	March 12, 2026	Signed one-year contract
LB	Dre Greenlaw	Denver Broncos	March 13, 2026	Signed one-year contract
CB	Nate Hobbs	Green Bay Packers	March 16, 2026	Signed one-year contract
WR	Christian Kirk	Houston Texans	March 18, 2026	Signed one-year contract
P	Corliss Waitman	Pittsburgh Steelers	March 18, 2026	Signed one-year contract
G	Robert Jones	Dallas Cowboys	March 24, 2026	Signed one-year contract
CB	Jack Jones	Miami Dolphins	April 13, 2026	Signed one-year contract
DE	Cameron Sample	Cincinnati Bengals	April 13, 2026	Signed one-year contract
RB	Sincere McCormick	Minnesota Vikings	April 28, 2026	Signed one-year contract
S	Patrick McMorris	New York Giants	April 28, 2026	Signed one-year contract
RB	Jermar Jefferson	Arizona Cardinals	May 28, 2026	Signed one-year contract
RB	Jordan Mims	Tennessee Titans	May 28, 2026	Signed one-year contract
S	Ashtyn Davis	Miami Dolphins	June 2, 2026	Signed one-year contract
RB	Sincere McCormick		June 10, 2026	Signed one-year contract
TE	Tanner McLachlan		July 25, 2026	Signed one-year contract
DE	Quinton Bell	Miami Dolphins	July 29, 2026	Signed one-year contract
DE	KJ Henry		July 29, 2026	Signed one-year contract
TE	Josiah Deguara	Arizona Cardinals	July 31, 2026	Signed one-year contract
WR	Trenton Irwin		July 31, 2026	Signed one-year contract
WR	Deebo Samuel	Washington Commanders	August 1, 2026	Signed one-year contract
RB	Khalil Herbert	New York Jets	August 2, 2026	Signed one-year contract
DE	Titus Leo		August 2, 2026	Signed one-year contract
WR	KhaDarel Hodge	Atlanta Falcons	August 5, 2026	Signed one-year contract
DE	Ogbo Okoronkwo	Philadelphia Eagles	August 5, 2026	Signed one-year contract
G	Kion Smith		August 6, 2026	Signed one-year contract
C	Doug Kramer Jr.		August 10, 2026	Signed one-year contract
RB	Zamir White	Las Vegas Raiders	August 12, 2026	Signed one-year contract
LB	Xavier Thomas		August 12, 2026	Signed one-year contract
CB	Eli Apple		August 12, 2026	Signed one-year contract
G	Nick Zakelj		August 17, 2026	Signed one-year contract
LB	Victor Dimukeje	New York Giants	August 17, 2026	Signed one-year contract
DT	Evan Anderson		August 18, 2026	Signed one-year contract
RB	Khalil Herbert		August 20, 2026	Signed one-year contract
TE	Khalil Dinkins		August 22, 2026	Signed three-year contract
DT	Viliami Fehoko		August 24, 2026	Signed one-year contract
DE	Jah Joyner		August 27, 2026	Signed one-year contract

Indicates that the player was a free agent at the end of his respective team's 2025 season.

==== Departures ====
Position	Player	Date	Notes
DE	Bryce Huff	March 12, 2026	Retired
CB	Tre Tomlinson	April 30, 2026	Waived
LB	Milo Eifler	May 11, 2026	Released
RB	Sincere McCormick	May 28, 2026	Waived
RB	Jermar Jefferson	June 2, 2026	Waived
RB	Jordan Mims	June 10, 2026	Waived
TE	Khalil Dinkins	July 25, 2026	Waived
DT	Evan Anderson	July 26, 2026	Waived
DE	Will Bradley-King	July 29, 2026	Waived
DE	Andrew Farmer	July 29, 2026	Waived
CB	Derrick Canteen	July 31, 2026	Waived
TE	Tanner McLachlan	July 31, 2026	Waived
CB	Eli Apple	August 2, 2026	Waived
DE	Mikail Kamara	August 2, 2026	Waived
DT	Kevin Givens	August 5, 2026	Waived
DE	Cameron Sample	August 5, 2026	Waived
WR	Colton Dowell	August 6, 2026	Waived
G	Nick Zakelj	August 10, 2026	Released
WR	Junior Bergen	August 12, 2026	Waived
P	Jack Bouwmeester	August 12, 2026	Waived
DE	KJ Henry	August 12, 2026	Waived
RB	Khalil Herbert	August 17, 2026	Released
G	Kion Smith	August 17, 2026	Released
DE	Titus Leo	August 18, 2026	Waived
LB	Xavier Thomas	August 22, 2026	Waived
TE	Josiah Deguara	August 24, 2026	Released

== Draft ==
2026 San Francisco 49ers draft selections
Round	Selection	Player	Position	College	Notes
1	27	Traded to the Miami Dolphins (Note: The 49ers traded a first- and fourth-round selection (27th and 138th overall) to Miami Dolphins in exchange for a first- and third-round selections (30th and 90th overall).)			
1	30	Traded to the New York Jets (Note: The 49ers traded a first-round selection (30th overall) to the New York Jets in exchange for a second- and fifth-round selection (33rd and 179th overall).)			From Broncos via Dolphins
2	33	De'Zhaun Stribling	WR	Ole Miss	From Jets
2	58	Traded to the Cleveland Browns (Note: The 49ers traded second- and fifth- round selections (58th and 152nd overall) to Cleveland Browns in exchange for third- and fourth-round selections (70th and 107th overall).)			
3	70	Romello Height	DE	Texas Tech	From Browns
3	90	Kaelon Black	RB	Indiana	From Dolphins
3	92	Traded to the Dallas Cowboys (Note: The 49ers traded a third-round selection (92nd overall) to the Dallas Cowboys in exchange for DT Osa Odighizuwa.)			
4	107	Gracen Halton	DT	Oklahoma	From Browns
4	127	Carver Willis	OT	Washington	
4	133	Traded to the Baltimore Ravens (Note: The 49ers traded a fourth-round selections (133rd overall) to Baltimore Ravens in exchange for a fifth-round selections (154th overall) and a 2027 sixth-round selections.)			Compensatory selection
4	138	Traded to the Miami Dolphins			Compensatory selection
4	139	Ephesians Prysock	CB	Washington	Compensatory selection
5	152	Traded to the Cleveland Browns			From Cowboys (Note: The 49ers traded LB Dee Winters to the Dallas Cowboys in exchange for a fifth-round selection (152nd overall).)
5	154	Jaden Dugger	LB	Louisiana	From Ravens
5	166	Traded to the Philadelphia Eagles (Note: The 49ers traded a conditional fifth-round selection (166th overall) to the Philadelphia Eagles in exchange for DE Bryce Huff. This selection would have become a fourth-round selection if Huff recorded eight sacks in 2025, but this condition was not met.)			
5	179	Enrique Cruz Jr.	OT	Kansas	Compensatory selection; From Jets
6	198	Traded to the New England Patriots (Note: The 49ers traded a sixth-round selection (198th overall) to the New England Patriots in exchange for a conditional seventh-round selection and DE Keion White. The condition – which would return the seventh-round selection to New England if White was active for 7 games – was converted on December 22, 2025.)			From Vikings via Texans and Vikings (Note: The 49ers traded a sixth-round selection (187th overall) and RB Jordan Mason to the Minnesota Vikings in exchange for a fifth-round selection (160th overall) and a 2026 sixth-round selection.)
6	209	Traded to the Washington Commanders (Note: The 49ers traded a sixth-round selection (209th overall) to the Washington Commanders in exchange for RB Brian Robinson Jr.)			
7	243	Traded to the Houston Texans (Note: The 49ers traded a seventh-round selection (243rd overall) to the Houston Texans in exchange for DT Khalil Davis.)			

2026 San Francisco 49ers undrafted free agents
Name	Position	College	Ref.
Jack Bouwmeester	P	Texas	
Khalil Dinkins	TE	Penn State	
Bryson Eason	DT	Tennessee	
Wesley Grimes	WR	NC State	
Mikail Kamara	DE	Indiana	
Will Pauling	WR	Notre Dame	
Jalen Stroman	S	Notre Dame	
James Thompson Jr.	DT	Illinois	
Larry Worth III	LB	Arkansas	

Draft trades

== Staff ==
San Francisco 49ers staff
Front office: Co-chairmen – John and Denise DeBartolo York; Principal owner – Jed York; Chief executive officer – Al Guido; President of football operations/general manager – John Lynch; Vice president and senior advisor – Keena Turner; Assistant general manager – Brian Hampton; Assistant general manager – RJ Gillen; Vice president of player personnel – Tariq Ahmad; Director of scouting and football operations – Josh Williams; Director of college scouting – Dominic DeCicco; Associate director of college scouting – Justin Chabot; Director of pro scouting – Fred Gammage III; Vice president of football R&D – Matt Ploenzke, PhD; Manager, football R&D – Shravan Ramamurthy; Senior personnel advisor – Frank Gore; Personnel executive – Ethan Waugh; Vice president of personnel & strategy – Kwesi Adofo-Mensah; Head coaches: Head coach – Kyle Shanahan; Assistant head coach/offensive line – Chris Foerster; Assistant head coach/defense – Matt Eberflus; Offensive coaches: Offensive coordinator – Klay Kubiak; Run game coordinator – Joe Graves; Quarterbacks – Mick Lombardi; Running backs – Robert Turner Jr; Passing game coordinator/wide receivers – Leonard Hankerson; Tight ends – Cameron Clemmons; Assistant offensive line – Roman Sapolu; Offensive assistant/wide receivers – Andrew Hayes-Stoker; Offensive assistant – Miguel Reveles; Offensive assistant/tight ends – Deuce Schwartz; Offensive assistant/quarterbacks – Jacob Webster	Defensive coaches: Defensive coordinator – Raheem Morris; Defensive pass game coordinator – Jerry Gray; Defensive run game coordinator – Johnny Holland; Defensive line – Kris Kocurek; Assistant defensive line – Greg Scruggs; Linebackers – K. J. Wright; Defensive backs/cornerbacks – Ray Brown; Defensive quality control – Cameron Brown; Defensive quality control – Jake Lynch; Defensive quality control – Angel Matute; Special teams coaches: Special teams coordinator – Brant Boyer; Assistant special teams – Colt Anderson; Special teams quality control – Ronald Blair III; Coaching operations/support staff: Chief of staff/football – Patrick Hagedorn; Coaching operations assistant – Max Molz; Seasonal coaching assistant – Micah Foerster; Strength and conditioning: Vice president, player health & performance – Dustin Perry; Head strength and conditioning – Mike Nicolini; Assistant strength and conditioning – Jordan Nieuwsma; Assistant strength and conditioning – Greg Segrove; Assistant strength and conditioning – Chauncey Scissum; → Coaching staff → Front office → More NFL staffs

== Current roster ==
San Francisco 49ers roster
Quarterbacks (QB): 10 Mac Jones; 13 Brock Purdy; 14 Kurtis Rourke; Running backs (RB): 26 Kaelon Black; 29 Jordan James; 44 Kyle Juszczyk FB; 23 Christian McCaffrey; Wide receivers (WR): 3 Keenan Allen; 84 Brandin Cooks; 4 Jacob Cowing PR; 5 Mike Evans; 11 Demarcus Robinson; 19 Deebo Samuel KR; 17 Jordan Watkins; Tight ends (TE): 89 Luke Farrell; 85 George Kittle; 9 Brayden Willis	Offensive linemen (OL): 64 Jake Brendel C; 75 Connor Colby G; 69 Enrique Cruz Jr. T; 76 Vederian Lowe T; 68 Colton McKivitz T; 58 Jarrett Patterson C; 77 Dominick Puni G; 71 Trent Williams T; 74 Carver Willis G; Defensive linemen (DL): 97 Nick Bosa DE; 99 DeForest Buckner DT; 94 Romello Height DE; 47 Khalid Kareem DE; 92 Osa Odighizuwa DT; 96 James Thompson Jr. DT; 55 Sebastian Valdez DT; 56 Keion White DE; 98 Mykel Williams DE	Linebackers (LB): 48 Tatum Bethune; 53 Jaden Dugger; 51 Luke Gifford; 57 Dre Greenlaw; 49 Garret Wallow; 54 Fred Warner; Defensive backs (DB): 27 Ji'Ayir Brown S; 24 Ashtyn Davis S; 0 Renardo Green CB; 2 Deommodore Lenoir CB; 6 Malik Mustapha S; 33 Siran Neal S; 28 Ephesians Prysock CB; 36 Marques Sigle S; 20 Upton Stout CB; Special teams (ST): 18 Eddy Piñeiro K; 15 Corliss Waitman P; 46 Jon Weeks LS	Practice squad: 67 Isaac Alarcón T (IPP); 50 Robert Beal Jr. DE; 40 Brandon Codrington CB; 82 Khalil Dinkins TE; 63 Viliami Fehoko DE; 41 Jalen Graham LB; 81 Wesley Grimes WR; 86 KhaDarel Hodge WR; 65 McKinnley Jackson DT; 25 Jack Jones CB; 35 Sincere McCormick RB; 66 Drake Nugent C; 59 Ogbo Okoronkwo DE; 18 Will Pauling WR; 61 Foster Sarell T; 83 Jack Stoll TE; 38 Jalen Stroman S; Reserve: -- Brandon Aiyuk WR (Left squad); 95 Alfred Collins DT (IR); 50 Andrew Farmer DE (IR); 29 Darrick Forrest S (IR); 31 Isaac Guerendo RB (PUP); 93 Gracen Halton DT (IR); 22 Nate Hobbs CB (IR); 59 Mikail Kamara DE (IR); 3 Christian Kirk WR (IR); 45 Nick Martin LB (IR); 91 Sam Okuayinonu DE (IR); 1 Ricky Pearsall WR (IR); 62 Austen Pleasants T (IR); 7 De'Zhaun Stribling WR (IR); 88 Jake Tonges TE (IR); 90 CJ West DT (IR); 63 Nick Zakelj G (IR) 53 active, 16 practice squad (1 IPP), 17 reserve As of November 11, 2026. Rookies in italics.; Roster; Depth chart; Transactions

== Preseason ==
Week	Date	Opponent	Result	Record	Venue	Recap
1	August 13	Tennessee Titans	L 13–19	0–1	Levi's Stadium	Recap
2	August 20	at Los Angeles Chargers	W 41–17	1–1	SoFi Stadium	Recap
3	August 27	at Las Vegas Raiders	W 18–12	2–1	Allegiant Stadium	Recap

== Regular season ==
=== Schedule ===
Week	Date	Time (PT)	Opponent	Result	Record	Venue	Network	Recap
1	September 10 (Note: September 11, 10:35 a.m. Australian Eastern Time Zone)	5:35 p.m.	at **Los Angeles Rams**	**W** 27–7	1–0	(Australia) Melbourne Cricket Ground (Melbourne)	Netflix (Note: Simulcast locally on KNTV)	Recap
2	September 20	1:25 p.m.	Miami Dolphins	**W** 35–13	2–0	Levi's Stadium	Fox	Recap
3	September 27	1:05 p.m.	**Arizona Cardinals**	**W** 36–30	3–0	Levi's Stadium	Fox	Recap
4	October 4	1:25 p.m.	Denver Broncos	**W** 24–14	4–0	Levi's Stadium	CBS	Recap
5	October 11	1:25 p.m.	at **Seattle Seahawks**	**W** 32–29	5–0	Lumen Field	Fox	Recap
6	October 19	5:15 p.m.	Washington Commanders	**W** 23–17	6–0	Levi's Stadium	ESPN/ABC	Recap
7	October 25	10:00 a.m.	at Atlanta Falcons	**L** 20–29	6–1	Mercedes-Benz Stadium	Fox	Recap
8	Bye							
9	November 8	1:25 p.m.	Las Vegas Raiders	**W** 38–17	7–1	Levi's Stadium	Fox	Recap
10	November 15	1:25 p.m.	at Dallas Cowboys	**W** 46–40	8–1	AT&T Stadium	Fox	Recap
11	November 22	5:20 p.m.	Minnesota Vikings			Estadio Azteca (Mexico City)	NBC	
12	November 29	1:25 p.m.	**Seattle Seahawks**			Levi's Stadium	Fox	
13	December 6	10:00 a.m.	at New York Giants			MetLife Stadium	Fox	
14	December 13	1:25 p.m.	**Los Angeles Rams**			Levi's Stadium	Fox	
15	December 17	5:15 p.m.	at Los Angeles Chargers			SoFi Stadium	Prime Video (Note: Simulcast locally on KTVU)	
16	December 27	1:25 p.m.	at Kansas City Chiefs			Arrowhead Stadium	CBS	
17	January 3	5:20 p.m.	Philadelphia Eagles			Levi's Stadium	NBC	
18	January 9/10	TBD	at **Arizona Cardinals**			State Farm Stadium	TBD	
Note: Intra-division opponents are in **bold** text.

- Networks, dates and times from Weeks 13–17 are subject to change as a result of flexible scheduling.
- The date, time and network for Week 18 will be finalized at the end of Week 17.

=== Game summaries ===
==== Week 1: at Los Angeles Rams ====
NFL International Series

Week 1: San Francisco 49ers at Los Angeles Rams – Game summary

Quarter	1	2	3	4	Total
**49ers**	3	7	7	10	**27**
Rams	0	7	0	0	**7**

at Melbourne Cricket Ground, Melbourne, Australia

- Date: September 10
- Game time: 5:35 p.m. PDT
- Game weather: Sunny, 57 °F (14 °C)
- Game attendance: 100,021
- Referee: Alex Kemp
- TV announcers (Netflix): Noah Eagle, Luke Kuechly, MJ Acosta-Ruiz and Tom Pelissero
  Game simulcast on KNTV and KNBC.
- Recap, Game Book

Game information

**First quarter**

- SF – Eddy Piñeiro 20-yard field goal, 6:15. 49ers 3–0. **Drive: 15 plays, 65 yards, 7:13.**

**Second quarter**

- LAR – Kyren Williams 5-yard run (Harrison Mevis kick), 14:57. Rams 7–3. **Drive: 4 plays, 57 yards, 1:55.**
- SF – Demarcus Robinson 39-yard pass from Brock Purdy (Eddy Piñeiro kick), 4:28. 49ers 10–7. **Drive: 9 plays, 86 yards, 4:24.**

**Third quarter**

- SF – Mike Evans 2-yard pass from Brock Purdy (Eddy Piñeiro kick), 11:03. 49ers 17–7. **Drive: 7 plays, 51 yards, 3:57.**

**Fourth quarter**

- SF – Deebo Samuel 15-yard pass from Brock Purdy (Eddy Piñeiro kick), 11:03. 49ers 24–7. **Drive: 11 plays, 99 yards, 5:44.**
- SF – Eddy Piñeiro 56-yard field goal, 9:43. 49ers 27–7. **Drive: 4 plays, 5 yards, 1:25.**

**Top passers**

- SF – Brock Purdy – 25/34, 205 yards, 3 TD, INT
- LAR – Matthew Stafford – 15/25, 155 yards, INT

**Top rushers**

- SF – Christian McCaffrey – 10 rushes, 68 yards
- LAR – Blake Corum – 10 rushes, 54 yards

**Top receivers**

- SF – Demarcus Robinson – 2 receptions, 50 yards, TD
- LAR – Puka Nacua – 5 receptions, 74 yards

==== Week 2: vs. Miami Dolphins ====
Week 2: Miami Dolphins at San Francisco 49ers – Game summary

Quarter	1	2	3	4	Total
Dolphins	0	6	0	7	**13**
**49ers**	7	7	21	0	**35**

at Levi's Stadium, Santa Clara, California

- Date: September 20
- Game time: 1:25 p.m. PDT
- Game weather: Cloudy, 69 °F (21 °C)
- Game attendance: 70,878
- Referee: Shawn Smith
- TV announcers (Fox): Kevin Kugler, Daryl Johnston and Allison Williams
- Recap, Game Book

Game information

**First quarter**

- SF – Christian McCaffrey 1-yard run (Eddy Piñeiro kick), 4:17. 49ers 7–0. **Drive: 12 plays, 59 yards, 6:11.**

**Second quarter**

- MIA – Riley Patterson 28-yard field goal, 9:56. 49ers 7–3. **Drive: 17 plays, 63 yards, 9:21.**
- SF – Brock Purdy 2-yard run (Eddy Piñeiro kick), 5:24. 49ers 14–3. **Drive: 8 plays, 71 yards, 4:32.**
- MIA – Riley Patterson 23-yard field goal, 0:00. 49ers 14–6. **Drive: 12 plays, 58 yards, 5:24.**

**Third quarter**

- SF – George Kittle 12-yard pass from Brock Purdy (Eddy Piñeiro kick), 13:08. 49ers 21–6. **Drive: 4 plays, 65 yards, 1:12.**
- SF – Kyle Juszczyk 6-yard pass from Brock Purdy (Eddy Piñeiro kick), 5:46. 49ers 28–6. **Drive: 8 plays, 71 yards, 5:03.**
- SF – Christian McCaffrey 1-yard run (Eddy Piñeiro kick), 3:10. 49ers 35–6. **Drive: 2 plays, 28 yards, 0:39.**

**Fourth quarter**

- MIA – Ryan Miller 77-yard pass from Malik Willis (Riley Patterso2 kick), 2:30. 49ers 35–13. **Drive: 3 plays, 83 yards, 1:33.**

**Top passers**

- MIA – Malik Willis – 14/23, 197 yards, TD
- SF – Brock Purdy – 20/22, 287 yards, 2 TD

**Top rushers**

- MIA – De'Von Achane – 20 rushes, 74 yards
- SF – Brock Purdy – 3 rushes, 30 yards, TD

**Top receivers**

- MIA – Ryan Miller – 1 receptions, 77 yards, TD
- SF – George Kittle – 4 receptions, 80 yards, TD

==== Week 3: vs. Arizona Cardinals ====
Week 3: Arizona Cardinals at San Francisco 49ers – Game summary

Quarter	1	2	3	4	Total
Cardinals	0	6	7	17	**30**
**49ers**	7	10	6	13	**36**

at Levi's Stadium, Santa Clara, California

- Date: September 27
- Game time: 1:05 p.m. PDT
- Game weather: Sunny, 70 °F (21 °C)
- Game attendance: 70,687
- Referee: Brad Allen
- TV announcers (Fox): Kevin Kugler, Daryl Johnston and Allison Williams
- Recap, Game Book

Game information

**First quarter**

- SF – Mike Evans 2-yard pass from Brock Purdy, lateral 80-yards to Deebo Samuel (Eddy Piñeiro kick), 8:26. 49ers 7–0. **Drive: 3 plays, 80 yards, 0:52.**

**Second quarter**

- SF – Mike Evans 23-yard pass from Brock Purdy (Eddy Piñeiro kick), 14:55. 49ers 14–0. **Drive: 10 plays, 93 yards, 5:16.**
- ARI – Chad Ryland 26-yard field goal, 3:04. 49ers 14–3. **Drive: 14 plays, 54 yards, 8:09.**
- ARI – Chad Ryland 41-yard field goal, 0:23. 49ers 14–6. **Drive: 8 plays, 59 yards, 1:07.**
- SF – Eddy Piñeiro 57-yard field goal, 0:00. 49ers 17–6. **Drive: 3 plays, 34 yards, 0:23.**

**Third quarter**

- SF – Christian McCaffrey 1-yard run (kick failed), 11:07. 49ers 23–6. **Drive: 7 plays, 56 yards, 3:53.**
- ARI – Michael Wilson 5-yard pass from Jacoby Brissett (Chad Ryland kick), 3:02. 49ers 23–13. **Drive: 14 plays, 69 yards, 8:05.**

**Fourth quarter**

- ARI – Jeremiyah Love 1-yard pass from Jacoby Brissett (Chad Ryland kick), 13:06. 49ers 23–20. **Drive: 5 plays, 28 yards, 2:25.**
- SF – George Kittle 10-yard pass from Brock Purdy (kick failed), 8:42. 49ers 29–20. **Drive: 8 plays, 65 yards, 4:24.**
- ARI – Jacoby Brissett 1-yard run (Chad Ryland kick), 2:51. 49ers 29–27. **Drive: 14 plays, 68 yards, 5:51.**
- SF – George Kittle 20-yard pass from Brock Purdy (Eddy Piñeiro kick), 1:31. 49ers 36–27. **Drive: 7 plays, 65 yards, 1:20.**
- ARI – Chad Ryland 49-yard field goal, 0:34. 49ers 36–30. **Drive: 5 plays, 35 yards, 0:57.**

**Top passers**

- ARI – Jacoby Brissett – 38/52, 280 yards, TD
- SF – Brock Purdy – 15/27, 297 yards, 4 TD

**Top rushers**

- ARI – Jeremiyah Love – 21 rushes, 90 yards
- SF – Christian McCaffrey – 15 rushes, 75 yards, TD

**Top receivers**

- ARI – Michael Wilson – 11 receptions, 89 yards, TD
- SF – George Kittle – 6 receptions, 82 yards, 2 TD

==== Week 4: vs. Denver Broncos ====
Week 4: Denver Broncos at San Francisco 49ers – Game summary

Quarter	1	2	3	4	Total
Broncos	3	0	0	11	**14**
**49ers**	0	3	7	14	**24**

at Levi's Stadium, Santa Clara, California

- Date: October 4
- Game time: 1:25 p.m. PDT
- Game weather: Sunny, 87 °F (31 °C)
- Game attendance: 70,776
- Referee: Ron Torbert
- TV announcers (CBS): Kevin Harlan, Trent Green and Melanie Collins
- Recap, Game Book

Game information

**First quarter**

- DEN – Will Lutz 52-yard field goal, 1:43. Broncos 3–0. **Drive: 13 plays, 55 yards, 7:48.**

**Second quarter**

- SF – Eddy Piñeiro 24-yard field goal, 1:36. Tied 3–3. **Drive: 12 plays, 74 yards, 3:25.**

**Third quarter**

- SF – Deebo Samuel 1-yard pass from Brock Purdy (Eddy Piñeiro kick), 4:15. 49ers 10–3. **Drive: 9 plays, 28 yards, 5:25.**

**Fourth quarter**

- DEN – Will Lutz 40-yard field goal, 14:08. 49ers 10–6. **Drive: 11 plays, 63 yards, 5:07.**
- SF – Christian McCaffrey 1-yard run (Eddy Piñeiro kick), 8:52. 49ers 17–6. **Drive: 9 plays, 74 yards, 5:16.**
- DEN – Jaylen Waddle 13-yard pass from Bo Nix (Tyler Badie run), 4:05. 49ers 17–14. **Drive: 8 plays, 70 yards, 4:47.**
- SF – George Kittle 56-yard pass from Brock Purdy (Eddy Piñeiro kick), 2:15. 49ers 24–14. **Drive: 5 plays, 69 yards, 1:50.**

**Top passers**

- DEN – Bo Nix – 25/42, 214 yards, TD
- SF – Brock Purdy – 19/30, 218 yards, 2 TD

**Top rushers**

- DEN – J.K. Dobbins – 11 rushes, 40 yards
- SF – Christian McCaffrey – 15 rushes, 52 yards, TD

**Top receivers**

- DEN – RJ Harvey – 10 receptions, 68 yards
- SF – Mike Evans – 5 receptions, 74 yards

With the win the 49ers improved to 4–0 for the first time since 2023. This was the 167th game coached for the team by Kyle Shanahan making him the sole record holder for most games coached in franchise history surpassing Bill Walsh.

==== Week 5: at Seattle Seahawks ====
Week 5: San Francisco 49ers at Seattle Seahawks – Game summary

Quarter	1	2	3	4	Total
**49ers**	7	14	0	11	**32**
Seahawks	7	6	13	3	**29**

at Lumen Field, Seattle, Washington

- Date: October 11
- Game time: 1:25 p.m. PDT
- Game weather: Sunny, 58 °F (14 °C)
- Game attendance: 68,664
- Referee: Land Clark
- TV announcers (Fox): Kevin Burkhardt, Tom Brady, Erin Andrews, and Tom Rinaldi
- Recap, Game Book

Game information

**First quarter**

- SF – Mike Evans 2-yard pass from Brock Purdy (Eddy Piñeiro kick), 11:12. 49ers 7–0. **Drive: 4 plays, 18 yards, 1:23.**
- SEA – Emanuel Wilson 2-yard run (Jason Myers kick), 5:43. Tied 7–7. **Drive: 6 plays, 24 yards, 3:40.**

**Second quarter**

- SEA – Jason Myers 49-yard field goal, 13:27. Seahawks 10–7. **Drive: 7 plays, 61 yards, 2:12.**
- SF – Christian McCaffrey 11-yard run (Eddy Piñeiro kick), 8:17. 49ers 14–10. **Drive: 1 play, 11 yards, 0:05.**
- SEA – Jason Myers 50-yard field goal, 1:56. 49ers 14–13. **Drive: 11 plays, 35 yards, 6:21.**
- SF – Gracen Halton fumble recovery in end zone (Eddy Piñeiro kick), 0:13. 49ers 21–13.

**Third quarter**

- SEA – Jason Myers 43-yard field goal, 8:56. 49ers 21–16. **Drive: 8 plays, 33 yards, 4:15.**
- SEA – Jaxon Smith-Njigba 16-yard pass from Sam Darnold (Jason Myers kick), 5:52. Seahawks 23–21. **Drive: 3 plays, 23 yards, 1:24.**
- SEA – Jason Myers 48-yard field goal, 3:02. Seahawks 21–26. **Drive: 4 plays, 6 yards, 1:59.**

**Fourth quarter**

- SF – Brandin Cooks 7-yard pass from Brock Purdy (Mike Evans–Brock Purdy pass), 11:02. 49ers 29–26. **Drive: 12 plays, 74 yards, 7:00.**
- SEA – Jason Myers 40-yard field goal, 6:55. Tied 29–29. **Drive: 7 plays, 33 yards, 4:07.**
- SF – Eddy Piñeiro 44-yard field goal, 1:56. 49ers 32–29. **Drive: 8 plays, 43 yards, 4:59.**

**Top passers**

- SF – Brock Purdy – 19/29, 189 yards, 2 TD, INT
- SEA – Sam Darnold – 18/29, 195 yards, TD, 2 INT

**Top rushers**

- SF – Christian McCaffrey – 11 rushes, 68 yards, TD
- SEA – Emanuel Wilson – 20 rushes, 61 yards, TD

**Top receivers**

- SF – Mike Evans – 7 receptions, 113 yards, TD
- SEA – Jaxon Smith-Njigba – 5 receptions, 102 yards, TD

The 49ers avenged last season's playoff loss to the reigning champion Seahawks with a dramatic 32–29 win and started the season 5–0 for the first time since 2023 and for the third time in the last seven seasons.

==== Week 6: vs. Washington Commanders ====
Week 6: Washington Commanders at San Francisco 49ers – Game summary

Quarter	1	2	3	4	Total
Commanders	3	0	7	7	**17**
**49ers**	13	7	3	0	**23**

at Levi's Stadium, Santa Clara, California

- Date: October 19
- Game time: 5:15 p.m. PDT
- Game weather: Fair, 64 °F (18 °C)
- Game attendance: 71,561
- Referee: Adrian Hill
- TV announcers (ESPN): Joe Buck, Troy Aikman and Lisa Salters
- Recap, Game Book

Game information

**First quarter**

- SF – George Kittle 11-yard pass from Brock Purdy (Eddy Piñeiro kick), 10:53. 49ers 7–0. **Drive: 9 plays, 64 yards, 4:07.**
- WSH – Drew Stevens 51-yard field goal, 8:48. 49ers 7–3. **Drive: 5 plays, 32 yards, 2:05.**
- SF – Christian McCaffrey 1-yard rush (kick failed), 4:09. 49ers 13–3. **Drive: 8 plays, 72 yards, 4:39.**

**Second quarter**

- SF – Christian McCaffrey 1-yard rush (Eddy Piñeiro kick), 4:09. 49ers 20–3. **Drive: 14 plays, 69 yards, 6:13.**

**Third quarter**

- SF – Eddy Piñeiro 33-yard field goal, 5:56. 49ers 23–3. **Drive: 11 plays, 65 yards, 5:41.**
- WSH – Stefon Diggs 1-yard pass from Jayden Daniels (Drew Stevens kick), 0:15. 49ers 23–10. **Drive: 11 plays, 65 yards, 5:41.**

**Fourth quarter**

- WSH – Rachaad White 9-yard pass from Jayden Daniels (Drew Stevens kick), 9:22. 49ers 23–17. **Drive: 10 plays, 80 yards, 4:43.**

**Top passers**

- WSH – Jayden Daniels – 39/40, 300 yards, 2 TD
- SF – Brock Purdy – 21/29, 264 yards, TD

**Top rushers**

- WSH – Rachaad White – 7 rushes, 27 yards
- SF – Christian McCaffrey – 16 rushes, 64 yards, 2 TD

**Top receivers**

- WSH – Chig Okonkwo – 7 receptions, 69 yards
- SF – Mike Evans – 3 receptions, 94 yards

==== Week 7: at Atlanta Falcons ====
Week 7: San Francisco 49ers at Atlanta Falcons – Game summary

Quarter	1	2	3	4	Total
49ers	7	7	0	6	**20**
**Falcons**	3	9	7	10	**29**

at Mercedes-Benz Stadium, Atlanta, Georgia

- Date: October 25
- Game time: 1:00 p.m. EDT/10:00 a.m. PDT
- Game weather: Sunny, 68 °F (20 °C) (retractable roof open)
- Game attendance: 72,165
- Referee: Clay Martin
- TV announcers (Fox): Kenny Albert, Greg Olsen, and Pam Oliver
- Recap, Game Book

Game information

**First quarter**

- SF – Christian McCaffrey 1-yard run (Eddy Piñeiro kick), 9:22. 49ers 7–0. **Drive: 10 plays, 64 yards, 5:38.**
- ATL – Nick Folk 39-yard field goal, 7:06. 49ers 7–3. **Drive: 5 plays, 15 yards, 2:16.**

**Second quarter**

- SF – Kaelon Black 30-yard run (Eddy Piñeiro kick), 14:54. 49ers 14–3. **Drive: 4 plays, 63 yards, 1:41.**
- ATL – Nick Muse 1-yard pass from Michael Penix Jr. (kick failed), 8:47. 49ers 14–9. **Drive: 10 plays, 68 yards, 6:07.**
- ATL – Nick Folk 33-yard field goal, 0:00. 49ers 14–12. **Drive: 14 plays, 56 yards, 4:20.**

**Third quarter**

- ATL – Kyle Pitts 5-yard pass from Michael Penix Jr. (Nick Folk kick), 8:59. Falcons 19–14. **Drive: 10 plays, 59 yards, 6:01.**

**Fourth quarter**

- ATL – Drake London 21-yard pass from Michael Penix Jr. (Nick Folk kick), 14:55. Falcons 26–14. **Drive: 11 plays, 90 yards, 5:37.**
- SF – Kyle Juszczyk 1-yard pass from Brock Purdy (kick failed), 5:05. Falcons 26–20. **Drive: 10 plays, 82 yards, 4:28.**
- ATL – Nick Folk 31-yard field goal, 1:56. Falcons 29–20. **Drive: 4 plays, 6 yards, 0:38.**

**Top passers**

- SF – Brock Purdy – 27/40, 288 yards, TD, 2 INT
- ATL – Michael Penix Jr. – 25/34, 213 yards, 3 TD

**Top rushers**

- SF – Kaelon Black – 12 rushes, 63 yards, TD
- ATL – Bijan Robinson – 20 rushes, 63 yards

**Top receivers**

- SF – George Kittle – 8 receptions, 88 yards
- ATL – Drake London – 7 receptions, 66 yards, TD

==== Week 9: vs. Las Vegas Raiders ====
Week 9: Las Vegas Raiders at San Francisco 49ers – Game summary

Quarter	1	2	3	4	Total
Raiders	0	10	7	0	**17**
**49ers**	14	7	14	3	**38**

at Levi's Stadium, Santa Clara, California

- Date: November 8
- Game time: 1:25 p.m. PST
- Game weather: Mostly sunny, 70 °F (21 °C)
- Game attendance: 71,753
- Referee: Scott Novak
- TV announcers (Fox): Kevin Kugler, Daryl Johnston and Allison Williams
- Recap, Game Book

Game information

**First quarter**

- SF – Christian McCaffrey 1-yard run (Eddy Piñeiro kick), 9:32. 49ers 7–0. **Drive: 12 plays, 69 yards, 5:28.**
- SF – Brock Purdy 1-yard rush (Eddy Piñeiro kick), 1:52. 49ers 14–0. **Drive: 13 plays, 89 yards, 6:29.**

**Second quarter**

- LV – Kirk Cousins 2-yard run (Matt Gay kick), 12:41. 49ers 14–7. **Drive: 8 plays, 62 yards, 4:11.**
- SF – Christian McCaffrey 12-yard pass from Brock Purdy (Eddy Piñeiro kick), 5:15. 49ers 21–7. **Drive: 12 plays, 84 yards, 7:26.**
- LV – Matt Gay 50-yard field goal, 1:12. 49ers 21–10. **Drive: 7 plays, 11 yards, 4:03.**

**Third quarter**

- SF – Jaden Dugger 35-yard interception return (Eddy Piñeiro kick), 14:43. 49ers 28–10. **Drive: 1 plays, 0 yards, 0:17.**
- LV – Brock Bowers 25-yard pass from Kirk Cousins (Matt Gay kick), 9:29. 49ers 28–17. **Drive: 9 plays, 69 yards, 5:14.**
- SF – Jordan Watkins 37-yard pass from Brock Purdy (Eddy Piñeiro kick), 0:36. 49ers 35–17. **Drive: 7 plays, 80 yards, 3:35.**

**Fourth quarter**

- SF – Eddy Piñeiro 35-yard field goal, 5:21. 49ers 38–17. **Drive: 12 plays, 63 yards, 6:34.**

**Top passers**

- LV – Kirk Cousins – 22/31, 216 yards, TD, 3 INT
- SF – Brock Purdy – 29/42, 255 yards, 4 TD, INT

**Top rushers**

- LV – Ashton Jeanty – 6 rushes, 25 yards
- SF – Kaelon Black – 11 rushes, 70 yards

**Top receivers**

- LV – Brock Bowers – 7 receptions, 111 yards, TD
- SF – Jordan Watkins – 4 receptions, 86 yards, TD

==== Week 10: at Dallas Cowboys ====
Week 10: San Francisco 49ers at Dallas Cowboys – Game summary

Quarter	1	2	3	4	Total
**49ers**	7	10	14	15	**46**
Cowboys	10	6	3	21	**40**

at AT&T Stadium, Arlington, Texas

- Date: November 15
- Game time: 3:25 p.m. CST/1:25 p.m. PST
- Game weather: None (retractable roof closed)
- Game attendance: 90,763
- Referee: John Hussey
- TV announcers (Fox): Kevin Burkhardt, Tom Brady, Erin Andrews and Tom Rinaldi
- Recap, Game Book

Game information

**First quarter**

- DAL – Brandon Aubrey 52-yard field goal, 12:11. Cowboys 3–0. **Drive: 8 plays, 35 yards, 2:49.**
- SF – Deebo Samuel 11-yard pass from Brock Purdy (Eddy Piñeiro kick), 6:56. 49ers 7–3. **Drive: 8 plays, 78 yards, 5:15.**
- DAL – George Pickens 35-yard pass from Dak Prescott (Brandon Aubrey kick), 1:08. Cowboys 10–7. **Drive: 11 plays, 71 yards, 5:48.**

**Second quarter**

- SF – Eddy Piñeiro 28-yard field goal, 6:54. Tied 10–10. **Drive: 14 plays, 61 yards, 7:45.**
- DAL – George Pickens 39-yard pass from Dak Prescott (kick failed), 4:08. Cowboys 16–10. **Drive: 7 plays, 61 yards, 2:46.**
- SF – Christian McCaffrey 74-yard pass from Brock Purdy (Eddy Piñeiro kick), 2:26. 49ers 17–16. **Drive: 3 plays, 76 yards, 1:42.**

**Third quarter**

- SF – Kaelon Black 25-yard run (Eddy Piñeiro kick), 12:10. 49ers 24–16. **Drive: 5 plays, 81 yards, 2:50.**
- DAL – Brandon Aubrey 52-yard field goal, 8:36. 49ers 24–19. **Drive: 7 plays, 38 yards, 3:34.**
- SF – Deebo Samuel 70-yard run (Eddy Piñeiro kick), 6:59. 49ers 31–19. **Drive: 3 plays, 80 yards, 1:37.**

**Fourth quarter**

- SF – Christian McCaffrey 16-yard run (Eddy Piñeiro kick), 11:26. 49ers 38–19. **Drive: 12 plays, 90 yards, 7:10.**
- DAL – George Pickens 5-yard pass from Dak Prescott (pass failed), 9:08. 49ers 38–25. **Drive: 6 plays, 65 yards, 2:18.**
- DAL – Ryan Flournoy 11-yard pass from Dak Prescott (Brandon Aubrey kick), 3:42. 49ers 38–32. **Drive: 10 plays, 66 yards, 3:00.**
- SF – Christian McCaffrey 66-yard pass from Brock Purdy (Brock Purdy-Christian McCaffrey pass), 3:23. 49ers 46–32. **Drive: 2 plays, 66 yards, 0:19.**
- DAL – CeeDee Lamb 1-yard pass from Dak Prescott (Dak Prescott run), 0:43. 49ers 46–40. **Drive: 12 plays, 76 yards, 2:40.**

**Top passers**

- SF – Brock Purdy – 22/28, 389 yards, 3 TD
- DAL – Dak Prescott – 30/51, 343 yards, 5 TD, INT

**Top rushers**

- SF – Deebo Samuel – 3 rushes, 78 yards, TD
- DAL – Javonte Williams – 16 rushes, 63 yards

**Top receivers**

- SF – Christian McCaffrey – 4 receptions, 161 yards, 2 TD
- DAL – George Pickens – 11 receptions, 145 yards, 3 TD

==== Week 11: vs. Minnesota Vikings ====
Mexico City Game

Week 11: Minnesota Vikings at San Francisco 49ers – Game summary

Quarter	1	2	3	4	Total
Vikings	0	0	0	0	**0**
49ers	0	0	0	0	**0**

at Estadio Azteca, Mexico City, Mexico

- Date: November 22
- Game time: 7:20 p.m. CST/5:20 p.m. PST
- Referee: Alex Moore
- TV announcers (NBC): Mike Tirico, Cris Collinsworth and Melissa Stark
- Preview

=== Standings ===
==== Division ====
NFC West
	W	L	T	PCT	DIV	CONF	PF	PA	STK
San Francisco 49ers	8	1	0	.889	3–0	5–1	281	196	W2
Seattle Seahawks	6	4	0	.600	2–1	2–3	223	175	W2
Los Angeles Rams	6	4	0	.600	1–2	4–2	248	187	W4
Arizona Cardinals	3	7	0	.300	1–4	2–6	184	289	L2

==== Conference ====
NFC
Seed	Team	Division	W	L	T	PCT	DIV	CONF	SOS	SOV	STK
**Division leaders**
1	San Francisco 49ers	West	8	1	0	.889	3–0	5–1	.431	.448	W2
2 (Note: Detroit wins tie break over Minnesota and Chicago based on head-to-head record.)	Detroit Lions	North	7	2	0	.778	2–0	4–1	.459	.403	W5
3	New York Giants	East	5	3	1	.611	2–1–1	3–3–1	.345	.277	L1
4	Carolina Panthers	South	4	5	0	.444	2–1	4–3	.524	.405	W1
**Wild cards**
5 (Note: Minnesota wins tie break over Chicago based on head-to-head victory.)	Minnesota Vikings	North	7	2	0	.778	3–1	5–1	.524	.439	W1
6	Chicago Bears	North	7	2	0	.778	0–2	5–2	.442	.373	W4
7 (Note: Green Bay wins tie break over Seattle based on conference record. Division tie break was initially used to eliminate LA Rams (see below).)	Green Bay Packers	North	6	4	0	.600	1–3	4–4	.521	.439	L1
**In the hunt**
8 (Note: Seattle wins tie break over LA Rams based on division record.)	Seattle Seahawks	West	6	4	0	.600	2–1	2–3	.516	.397	W2
9	Los Angeles Rams	West	6	4	0	.600	1–2	4–2	.484	.339	W4
10	Dallas Cowboys	East	4	6	0	.400	2–1	2–5	.436	.311	L1
11	Washington Commanders	East	3	5	1	.389	2–2–1	3–4–1	.494	.482	W1
12 (Note: Tampa Bay wins tie break over New Orleans based on division record.)	Tampa Bay Buccaneers	South	3	6	0	.333	2–0	3–3	.588	.379	L1
13	New Orleans Saints	South	3	6	0	.333	0–2	1–4	.547	.534	L1
14 (Note: Atlanta wins tie break over Arizona based on conference record.)	Atlanta Falcons	South	3	7	0	.300	1–2	3–3	.598	.607	L3
15	Arizona Cardinals	West	3	7	0	.300	1–4	2–6	.595	.379	L2
16	Philadelphia Eagles	East	2	7	0	.222	1–3	1–6	.500	.250	L7
