= NFL passer rating leaders =

NFL passer rating leaders may refer to:

- List of NFL annual passer rating leaders
- List of NFL career passer rating leaders
