= List of Wagner Seahawks in the NFL draft =

This is a list of Wagner Seahawks football players in the NFL draft.

== Key ==
| B | Back | K | Kicker | NT | Nose tackle |
| C | Center | LB | Linebacker | FB | Fullback |
| DB | Defensive back | P | Punter | HB | Halfback |
| DE | Defensive end | QB | Quarterback | WR | Wide receiver |
| DT | Defensive tackle | RB | Running back | G | Guard |
| E | End | T | Offensive tackle | TE | Tight end |

| = Pro Bowler |
| = Hall of Famer |

== Selections ==
| Year | Round | Pick | Player | Team | Position |
|---|---|---|---|---|---|
| 1961 | 7 | 85 | Allan Ferrie | Minnesota Vikings | E |
| 1965 | 18 | 247 | Rich Kotite | Minnesota Vikings | TE |
| 2018 | 6 | 212 | Greg Senat | Baltimore Ravens | T |
| 2023 | 6 | 211 | Titus Leo | Indianapolis Colts | LB |
