= Brock Purdy =

American football player (born 1999)

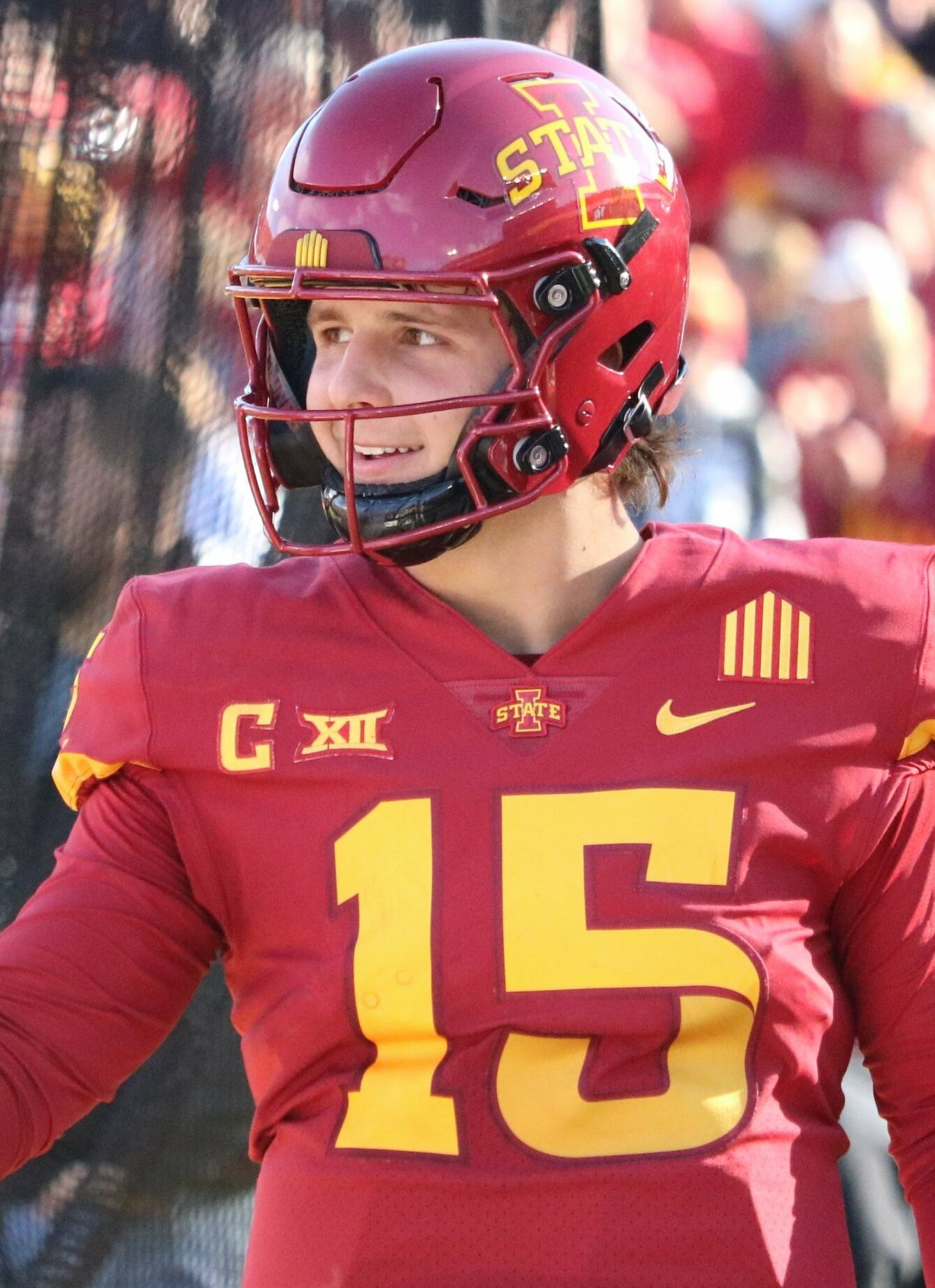
- Purdy with the Iowa State Cyclones in 2021

No. 13 – San Francisco 49ers
- Position: Quarterback
- Roster status: Active

Personal information
- Born: December 27, 1999 (age 26); Queen Creek, Arizona, U.S.
- Listed height: 6 ft 1 in (1.85 m)
- Listed weight: 220 lb (100 kg)

Career information
- High school: Perry (Gilbert, Arizona)
- College: Iowa State (2018–2021)
- NFL draft: 2022: 7th round, 262nd overall pick

Career history
- San Francisco 49ers (2022–present)

Awards and highlights
- Pro Bowl (2023); NFL passer rating leader (2023); PFWA All-Rookie Team (2022); 2× First-team All-Big 12 (2020, 2021); Second-team All-Big 12 (2019); NFL records: Highest career passer rating: 105.8 (Note: Minimum 1,500 career passing attempts.)

Career NFL statistics as of Week 10, 2026
- Passing attempts: 1,617
- Passing completions: 1,104
- Completion percentage: 68.3%
- TD–INT: 104–42
- Passing yards: 14,054
- Passer rating: 105.8
- Rushing yards: 849
- Rushing touchdowns: 13
- Stats at Pro Football Reference

Brock Richard Purdy (born December 27, 1999) is an American professional football quarterback for the San Francisco 49ers of the National Football League (NFL). He played college football for the Iowa State Cyclones and was selected by the 49ers with the final pick in the 2022 NFL draft, becoming that year's Mr. Irrelevant.

Purdy began his rookie season in the NFL as the third-string quarterback but took the starting role following injuries to Trey Lance and Jimmy Garoppolo. Winning all five regular-season games that he started, Purdy played a key role in the 49ers securing a division title and an NFC Championship Game appearance. Purdy continued as the 49ers' starting quarterback in the 2023 season, where he led them to a repeat division title and led the league in multiple passing categories before an appearance in Super Bowl LVIII. Purdy also set the franchise's single season passing yards record and earned his first Pro Bowl selection. Purdy currently holds the NFL record for highest career passer rating.

== Early life ==
Purdy was born on December 27, 1999, in Queen Creek, Arizona. He played high school football for Perry High School in Gilbert, Arizona. Purdy is the middle child of Shawn and Carrie Purdy. He is of partial Armenian descent through his paternal grandmother. Shawn was a Minor League Baseball player for eight seasons. His older sister Whittney played softball at Southeastern University. His younger brother Chubba later became the starting quarterback at Perry before being recruited to Florida State as a dual-threat quarterback. As a youth, Purdy played quarterback in a flag football league. His father attributed Purdy's later success in part to the faster processing speed required to play flag football; quarterbacks were given seven seconds to dispose of the football before plays were blown dead.

Purdy started his varsity football career during the 2015 season as a sophomore for the newly opened Perry High School. In 2016, the Arizona Interscholastic Association (AIA) adjusted the athletic regions, placing Perry in the 6A Division Premier Region, ranked as the sixth toughest region in the nation. Purdy's performance elevated Perry into the 6A Division AIA State Championship game in 2016 and 2017, losing 65–28 and 48–42, respectively, both to Chandler High School.

Purdy established himself as a football power in Arizona, competing against Chandler Unified School District's more established powerhouse programs such as Chandler High (0–5), Hamilton (4–2) and Basha (2–1). Purdy achieved a 27–13 record at Perry. He was named Gatorade's Football Player of the Year for Arizona and was The Arizona Republic's high-school player of the year.

Purdy was considered a three-star prospect by 247Sports. He signed his letter of intent to commit to Iowa State University on February 7, 2018, enrolling in June of that year.

College recruiting
Name	Hometown	School	Height	Weight	Commit date
Brock Purdy; QB	Queen Creek, Arizona	Perry High School	6 ft 1 in (1.85 m)	202 lb (92 kg)	Feb 7, 2018
Brock Purdy; QB	Recruit ratings: Scout: Rivals: 247Sports: ESPN:				
Overall recruit ranking: 247Sports: 839
Note: In many cases, Scout, Rivals, 247Sports, On3, and ESPN may conflict in their listings of height and weight.; In these cases, the average was taken. ESPN grades are on a 100-point scale.; Sources: "2018 Team Ranking". Rivals.com.

== College career ==
Purdy entered his freshman year for the Cyclones in 2018 as the third string to Kyle Kempt and Zeb Noland. He became the starter after Kempt was injured and Noland was ineffective. Overall, Purdy started eight games, completing 146-of-220 passes for 2,250 yards, 16 touchdowns, and seven interceptions for what would prove to be a career-best 169.9 passer rating (sixth best in all NCAA football), and compiling a 7–2 record for the Cyclones. In addition, he rushed for 308 yards and five touchdowns.

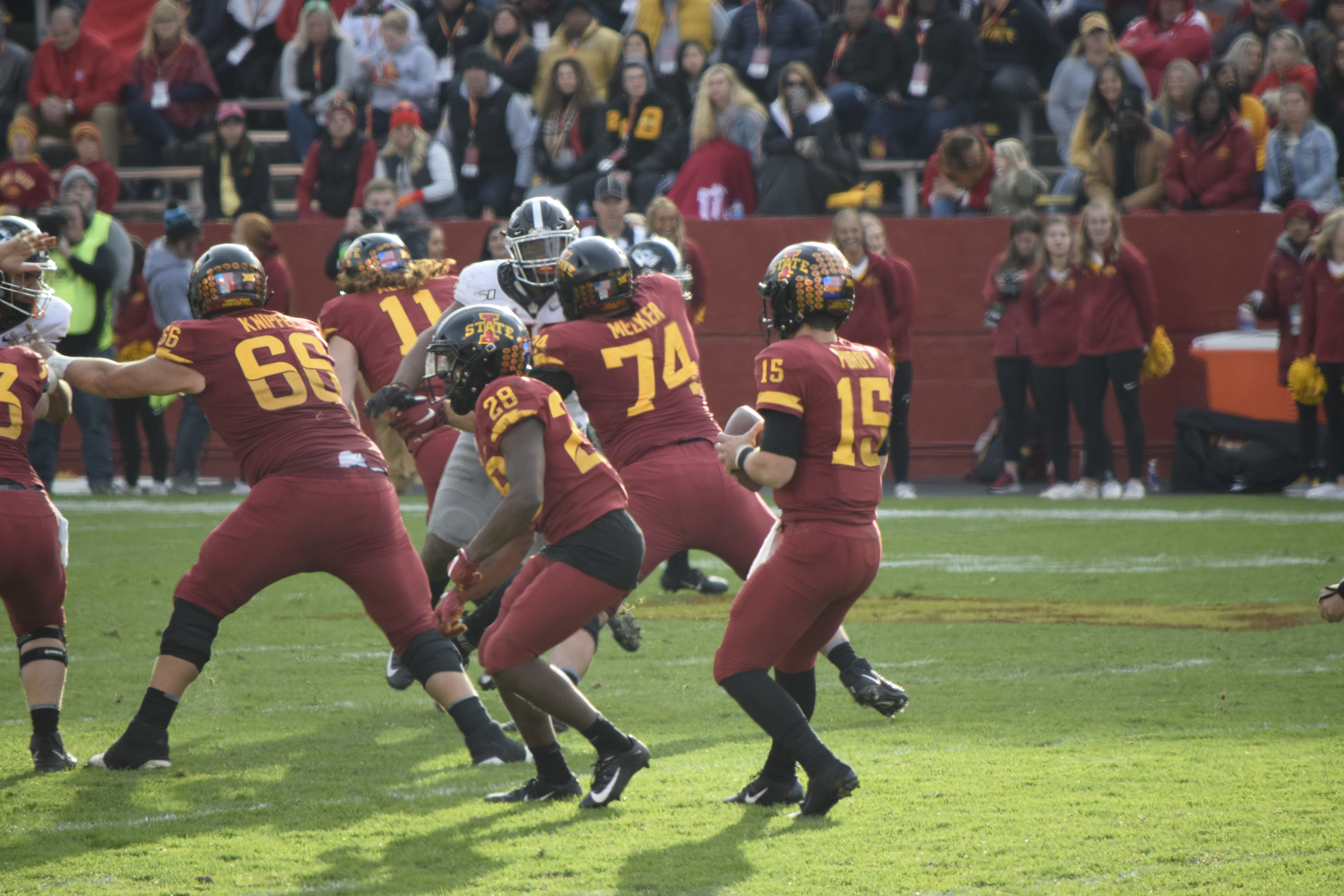
Purdy (#15) playing against Oklahoma State in 2019

During Purdy's sophomore season in 2019, he started all 13 games, compiling a 7–6 record. The year was highlighted by 435 yards and a school-record 510 total yards, along with three passing and three rushing touchdowns against Louisiana-Monroe, five passing touchdowns and one rushing touchdown in a narrow 42–41 loss to the then number 9 Oklahoma Sooners, and 372 yards with three passing touchdowns and one rushing touchdown in a win over Kansas. He passed for a touchdown in 12 consecutive games and completed 39 passes against a single team, Oklahoma State—both school records. Purdy also led the Big 12 Conference in passing yards with 3,982 and was third in total touchdowns, 27 of them passing, which broke George Amundson's 41-year-old school record of 24 total touchdowns.

During Purdy's junior year in 2020, he and running back Breece Hall led the Cyclones to a 9–3 record (tied with the 2000 season for the best record in program history) and a number 9 national ranking, their highest in school history dating to 1895. Purdy had three touchdowns and no interceptions in a 45–0 shutout of Kansas State, followed two weeks later by completing 20-of-23 passes for three touchdowns and rushing for 38 yards and another touchdown during a 42–6 victory over West Virginia. In the Fiesta Bowl, Purdy passed and rushed for a touchdown in a 34–17 win over Oregon.

In his 2021 senior year, Purdy and Hall again led the Cyclones to a 7–6 record, highlighted by 307 yards and two touchdowns in a 24–21 victory over number 8 Oklahoma State. Purdy also had 356 yards and three touchdowns against Texas Tech, but Iowa State lost in a 41–38 shootout. The season was a disappointment to an Iowa State team ranked number 7 entering the season, but Purdy's 71.7 percent completion percentage and 3,188 yards again led the Big 12.

Purdy ended his time at Iowa State as a three-time All-Big 12 quarterback, holding 32 school records including career pass attempts, completions, percentage, yards, and both passing (81) and total (100) touchdowns. His 14 games with 300-plus passing yards was nearly triple the previous school record of five by Bret Meyer. Purdy's four years at Iowa State corresponded with the first time the school's football program had seen four consecutive winning seasons since 1923–1927. Purdy graduated from Iowa State in 2021 with a degree in communication studies.

== Professional career ==
=== NFL draft ===
Pre-draft measurables
Height	Weight	Arm length	Hand span	Wingspan	40-yard dash	10-yard split	20-yard split	20-yard shuttle	Three-cone drill	Vertical jump
6 ft 0 5/8 in (1.84 m)	212 lb (96 kg)	29 in (0.74 m)	9 1/4 in (0.23 m)	5 ft 10 1/8 in (1.78 m)	4.84 s	1.55 s	2.73 s	4.45 s	7.21 s	27.0 in (0.69 m)
All values from NFL Combine

The San Francisco 49ers selected Purdy with the final pick (262nd overall) of the 2022 NFL draft, making him that year's Mr. Irrelevant. The Athletic later obtained the scouting report of another NFL team that evaluated Purdy but opted not to draft him; the report described Purdy as experienced and "works through his progressions very well" but "not a very good athlete...limited arm, both in strength and throw repertoire." After observing Purdy's subsequent performance in his first NFL season, the coach who authored the report told The Athletic that while Purdy's record in college was impressive, "The requirement to juke people and outrun people in college is a lot lower than it is in the NFL... In college, they might be able to outrun that D-end or pull away from that linebacker, but they got hawked down in the NFL. But Purdy has kinda maintained that and almost surpassed his level of agility in the NFL." The coach indicated that Purdy's performance in his first NFL season would likely have warranted being drafted in the second or third round, saying: "We undervalued his agility and probably the mental side, and San Francisco is perfect for it because they put a lot of importance on that because of their offense."

In October 2023, former 49er quarterback and Hall of Fame member Steve Young opined that Purdy was overlooked in the draft because his calmness under pressure would not have been apparent: "...the [quarterback] position is really about guile and an innate gift from heaven, in some ways, to be able to have your heart rate go down when everyone else is in anxiety and pressure... But in the NFL, very few are naturally at peace. And that's why when I compare him to Patrick Mahomes, I'm comparing him to how Patrick feels at peace. We all grew into it. Some guys just show up. Patrick showed up at peace, and so did Brock. The draft doesn't understand that thing."

=== 2022 ===
Trey Lance was named the starter over Jimmy Garoppolo for the 2022 season, making Purdy the third-string quarterback. A week into training camp during the 2022 preseason, 49ers head coach Kyle Shanahan told 49ers CEO Jed York that he thought Purdy was the team's best quarterback. According to York, Shanahan told him that nevertheless they would continue to invest in Lance as the starter: "Obviously we’ve invested in Trey and Trey's doing a good job and we're going to do everything that we can. We're not going to change that. And we're not going to change our depth chart. But I think Brock will end up being our quarterback." York publicly recounted this story ahead of Super Bowl LVIII, praising both Shanahan's candor and decision process: "...one thing that owners don't love to hear when they've invested money and/or draft picks or both into people is that the last pick in the draft is the guy that we think is the best. That’s generally not great news. But he's honest. And he let it play out the right way."

Lance appeared in only two games before suffering a season-ending ankle injury against the Seattle Seahawks in Week 2. During a Week 5 37–15 road victory over the Carolina Panthers, Purdy made his NFL debut, taking a knee to close out the game. Two weeks later against the Kansas City Chiefs, he relieved Garoppolo on the 49ers' last drive, throwing for 66 yards and an interception in the 44–23 loss. 49ers CEO York later said that Purdy's performance gave him some doubts: "I think Brock threw one ball into the stands. And I may or may not have had some sarcastic comments for Kyle postgame."

During a Week 13 33–17 victory over the Miami Dolphins, Garoppolo suffered a foot injury in the first quarter, causing the 49ers to call upon Purdy once again. Purdy performed efficiently, and finished the game completing 25-of-37 passes for 210 yards, two touchdowns—one to running back Christian McCaffrey and one to fullback Kyle Juszczyk—and an interception. Purdy became the first 'Mr. Irrelevant' to throw a touchdown pass in a regular season game. (Note: Seven quarterbacks have been 'Mr. Irrelevant'.) Following Garoppolo's injury, Purdy was named the 49ers' starting quarterback for the remainder of the 2022 season. On December 11, Purdy became the only quarterback in his first career start to beat a team led by Tom Brady, when the 49ers defeated the Tampa Bay Buccaneers 35–7. Purdy finished the game with 185 passing yards and two passing touchdowns to go along with a two-yard rushing touchdown. After the game, the 49ers sent out a tweet dubbing Purdy "Mr. Relevant." In the next game against the Seahawks, Purdy had 17-for-26 passing with 217 yards and two touchdowns, both to George Kittle, during the 21–13 victory as the 49ers clinched the NFC West. Purdy became the second player in NFL history, after Aaron Rodgers, to record a cumulative total quarterback rating of 115 or greater in his first two starts.

During Week 16 against the Washington Commanders, Purdy had 234 passing yards, two touchdowns, and an interception in the 37–20 victory. In the next game against the Las Vegas Raiders, he threw for 284 yards, two touchdowns, and an interception during the 37–34 overtime road victory. On January 12, 2023, the NFL named Purdy as the National Football Conference (NFC)'s Rookie of the Month for December and January. Purdy finished the regular season throwing for 1,374 yards for 13 touchdowns and four interceptions, winning all five of his starts and leading the 49ers to the second seed in the playoffs. Purdy's passer rating of 119.4 through his five starts is the highest for a quarterback in his first five starts since Kurt Warner in 1999. He was named to the PFWA All-Rookie Team.

During the Wild Card Round against the Seahawks, Purdy became the first 49ers rookie quarterback to start and win a playoff game, while putting him 6–0 in career starts. During the 41–23 victory, he completed 18-of-30 passes for 332 yards and scored four total touchdowns (three passing, one rushing), the most by a rookie quarterback in a playoff game. With this victory, Purdy also became the lowest-drafted quarterback to start and win a playoff game, and became the first rookie quarterback since Sammy Baugh in 1937 to have at least 200 pass yards and two pass scores in a playoff win. This also made Purdy the first rookie quarterback to do so since the AFL–NFL merger. With the 49ers' subsequent 19–12 victory in the Divisional Round over the Dallas Cowboys, Purdy became the third quarterback since 1970 to win two playoff games in his rookie season with the others being Mark Sanchez and Joe Flacco (later matched by Jayden Daniels). Although throwing no touchdowns in this game, Purdy completed 19-of-29 passes for 214 yards, which also made him the first rookie quarterback since 1970 to throw over 200 yards in consecutive NFL postseason games.

During the first quarter of the NFC Championship Game against the Philadelphia Eagles, Purdy suffered an injury to his right elbow. He was replaced by Josh Johnson. Following Johnson's concussion in the third quarter, Purdy reentered the game, though he would only throw two more passes; Purdy was primarily tasked with handing off the ball to his teammates. The 49ers would go on to lose on the road 31–7. Purdy was diagnosed with a complete tear of his ulnar collateral ligament, which rendered him unable to throw the ball more than 10 yards.

=== 2023 ===
After a successful recovery from injury, Purdy was named the starting quarterback to begin the 2023 season, over Sam Darnold, Brandon Allen, and Trey Lance, the lattermost later being traded to the Cowboys.

During the season-opening 30–7 road victory over the Pittsburgh Steelers, Purdy completed 19-of-29 passing attempts for 220 yards, two touchdowns (both to Brandon Aiyuk), and a passer rating of 111.3. With the 49ers' win and two touchdown passes on the day, Purdy became the first quarterback in NFL history to win his first six career regular season starts and throw at least two touchdown passes in each of those starts. With a passer rating of 111.3, Purdy also became the first quarterback in NFL history to register a passer rating of 95.0 or higher in each of his first six career regular-season starts. Three weeks later the Arizona Cardinals, the 49ers won by a score of 35–16 with Purdy completing 20-of-21 passes for 283 yards and a touchdown, setting a new 49ers franchise record for highest single-game completion rate of 95.2%. The prior franchise record of 90% had been set by Steve Young in Week 8 of the 1991 season. During a Week 5 42–10 victory over the Cowboys, Purdy completed 17-of-24 passes for 252 yards and four touchdowns. With this victory, Purdy became the fourth quarterback in NFL history (after Kurt Warner, Peyton Manning, and Tom Brady) to lead a team that scored 30 points or more in at least 8 consecutive regular season games. The following week against the Cleveland Browns, Purdy suffered his first regular season loss after rookie kicker Jake Moody missed a 41-yard field goal as time expired in the fourth quarter. Purdy finished the narrow 19–17 road loss completing 12-of-27 passes for 125 yards, a touchdown, and an interception for a 55.3 passer rating.

Purdy entered concussion protocol following a Week 7 road loss to the Minnesota Vikings after experiencing symptoms on the flight home. However, he was cleared in time for the next game against the Cincinnati Bengals, which the 49ers lost 31–17.

During a Week 10 34–3 road victory over the Jacksonville Jaguars, Purdy threw for 296 yards and three touchdowns, setting a new career record passer rating of 148.9. This was the third time in his NFL career that Purdy had thrown at least three touchdowns with a passer rating of 140 or more; the only other NFL quarterback to have done the same in his first two seasons is Kurt Warner. In the next game against the Buccaneers, Purdy completed 21-of-25 passes for 333 yards and three touchdowns for a perfect passer rating of 158.3. This was the first time a 49ers quarterback achieved a perfect passer rating since Joe Montana in 1989, and the only time a 49ers quarterback has accomplished that feat with 25 or more attempts in a game. Purdy was subsequently named the NFC Offensive Player of the Week and FedEx Air NFL Player of the Week for his performance. Two weeks later against the Eagles, Purdy completed 19-of-27 passes for 314 yards and four touchdowns as the 49ers won on the road 42–19. He was again named FedEx Air NFL Player of the Week. During a Week 14 28–16 victory over the Seahawks, Purdy threw for 368 yards and two touchdowns with a completion rate of 70.4%, and was named FedEx Air NFL Player of the Week for the second week in a row.

During a Week 15 45–29 road victory over the Cardinals, Purdy led the 49ers to a second consecutive NFC West title as he completed 16-of-25 passes for 245 yards and four touchdowns with a passer rating of 135.3. Purdy left the game in the second quarter and was assessed in the medical tent for what head coach Kyle Shanahan believed was a head injury, but Purdy eventually returned to the game after the medical staff assessed that Purdy had a shoulder stinger. Backup quarterback Darnold substituted Purdy for three plays while he was in the medical tent. In the next game against the Baltimore Ravens, Purdy completed 18-of-32 passes for 255 yards, no touchdowns, and four interceptions during the 33–19 loss. His 255 passing yards allowed him to surpass 4,000 passing yards in a season, the first 49ers quarterback to do so since Jeff Garcia in 2000. The following week against the Commanders, Purdy threw for 230 yards and two touchdowns as the 49ers won on the road 27–10, surpassing Garcia's franchise season passing yards record by two yards. On January 3, 2024, Shanahan stated that Purdy would not play in the regular-season finale against the Los Angeles Rams. Later that day, the NFL announced that Purdy had been selected as the NFC's starting quarterback for the 2024 Pro Bowl Games. He completed the regular season leading the league in passer rating, total quarterback rating, and yards gained per attempt.

At home against the Green Bay Packers in the Divisional Round, Purdy struggled with accuracy in rainy conditions as the 49ers trailed entering the fourth quarter. Despite his struggles, Purdy engineered a 12-play, 69-yard drive that culminated with Christian McCaffrey scoring a go-ahead touchdown with under two minutes left as the 49ers won 24–21. Purdy was 6-of-7 for 47 yards on the game-winning drive and finished the game completing 23 of his 39 passes for 252 yards and a touchdown. In the NFC Championship Game against the Detroit Lions, Purdy only completed seven of his 15 pass attempts for 93 yards and an interception as San Francisco trailed 24–7 at halftime. In the second half, Purdy completed 13-of-16 passes for 174 yards and a touchdown. He also scrambled for 49 rushing yards as he rallied the 49ers from a 17-point deficit at halftime to win 34–31, advancing to Super Bowl LVIII. Purdy became the lowest drafted quarterback to start a Super Bowl. In the Super Bowl, Purdy completed 23-of-38 passes for 255 yards and a touchdown during the 25–22 overtime loss to the Kansas City Chiefs. He was ranked 28th by his fellow players on the NFL Top 100 Players of 2024.

=== 2024 ===
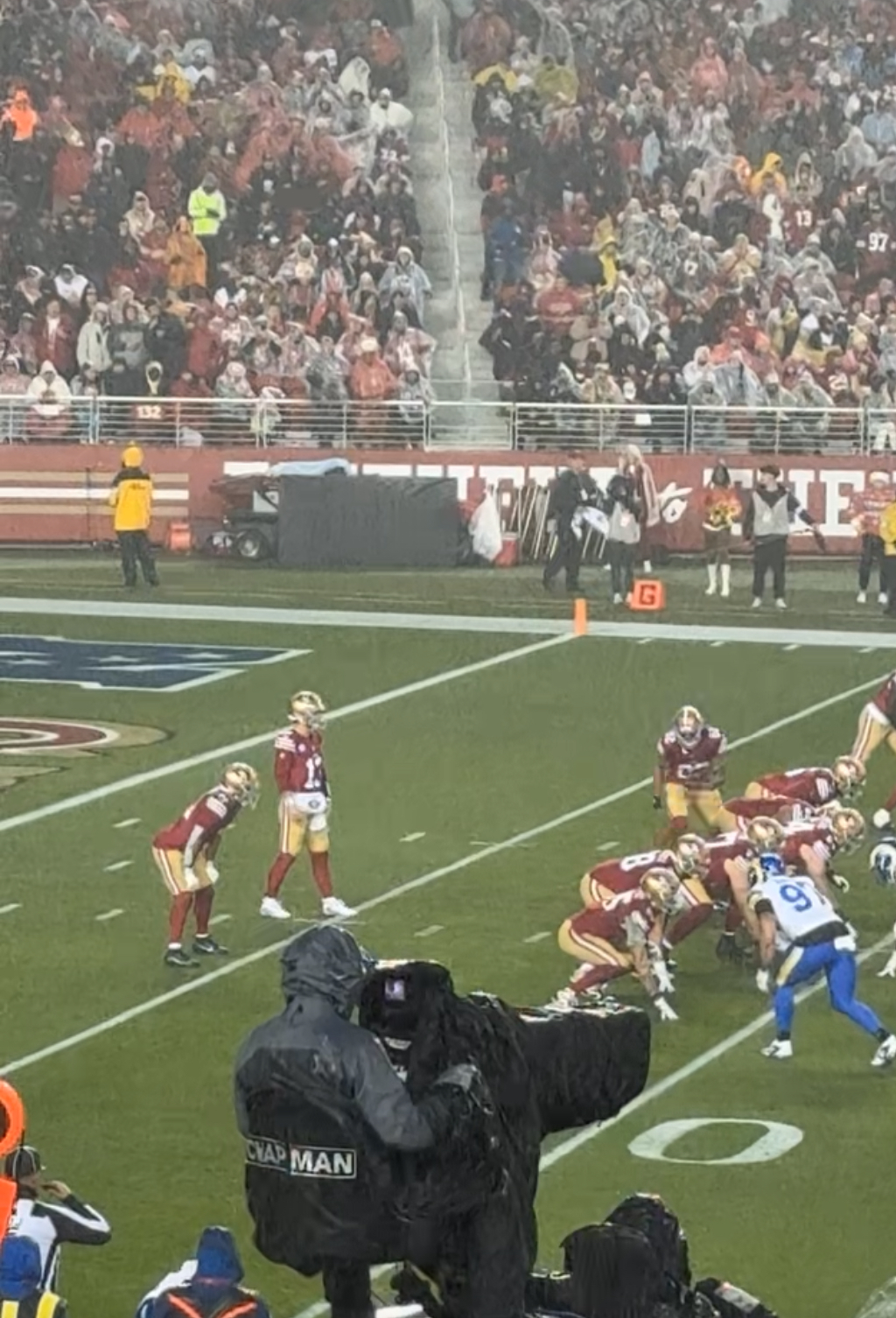
Purdy leading the 49ers offense in 2024

During Week 5 against the Arizona Cardinals, Purdy made his 50th career touchdown pass after passing to George Kittle. He also became the fastest quarterback in 49ers franchise history to achieve 50 career touchdown passes. Purdy finished the 2024 season with 3,864 passing yards and 20 passing touchdowns to 12 interceptions for a 96.1 passer rating. This statistical regression in comparison to his 2023 campaign was largely attributed to injuries suffered by several of the 49ers' most productive pass-catchers, with both Brandon Aiyuk and Christian McCaffrey absent for the majority of the season. However, Purdy had his most successful season to date on the ground, rushing for 323 yards and leading the team with five rushing touchdowns.

The 49ers as a whole struggled with injuries in 2024, ending with a 6–11 record and failing to qualify for the playoffs for the first time since 2020. In addition to Aiyuk and McCaffrey, Trent Williams, Nick Bosa, Dre Greenlaw, Talanoa Hufanga, Jordan Mason, and Mitch Wishnowsky all missed significant playing time. Purdy himself did not play in two games (a Week 12 loss to the Green Bay Packers and a Week 18 loss to the Cardinals) due to injuries he sustained to his right shoulder and elbow. He also briefly exited the Week 14 win over the Chicago Bears after getting hurt on a hard hit to the head.

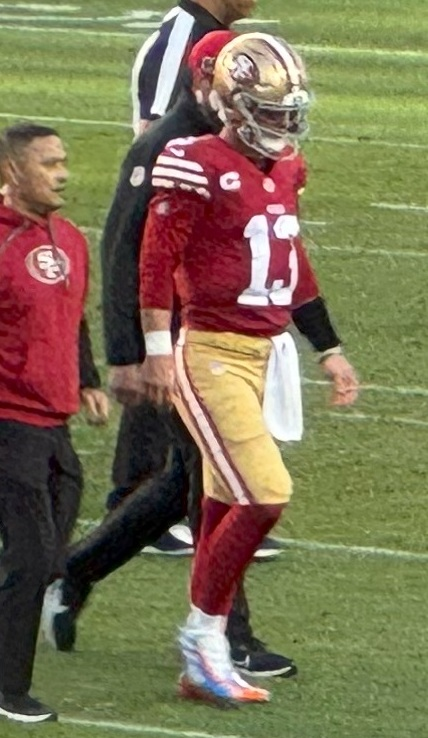
Purdy being led off the field after his head injury in Week 14

=== 2025 ===
On May 20, 2025, Purdy signed a five-year, $265 million contract extension with the 49ers.

During the season opener against the Seattle Seahawks, Purdy suffered injuries to his left shoulder and toe, with the latter being the greater issue of the two. On September 12, Purdy was ruled out for the week 2 matchup against the New Orleans Saints. Mac Jones was named the starting quarterback for the 49ers after Purdy's injury. On December 22, Purdy put up 295 passing yards with a career-high five passing touchdowns in a 48–27 win over the Indianapolis Colts in Week 16. The next week, Purdy again put up five total touchdowns (three passing, two rushing) alongside 303 passing yards and a 118.6 passer rating in a 42–38 victory over the Chicago Bears.

Purdy finished the 2025 season completing an equal career-high 69.4% of his passes for 2,167 yards, 20 touchdowns and 10 interceptions as the 49ers were 7–2 in the nine games he started. During the wild card round, Purdy overcame two interceptions to defeat the defending champion Philadelphia Eagles on the road 23–19. However, Purdy played poorly in the divisional round game against Seattle, going just 15-for-27 for 140 yards with an interception during the road 41–6 loss to end their season.

=== 2026 ===
In Week 2 against the Miami Dolphins, Purdy went 20-for-22 for 287 passing yards and three total touchdowns in the 35–13 victory, earning him NFC Offensive Player of the Week. During a game against the Washington Commanders, Purdy set the record for the highest passer rating in NFL history (105.6 at the time of setting the record) upon surpassing 1,500 career passing attempts, surpassing the previous record held by Ravens quarterback Lamar Jackson (102.7). A week after, Purdy went 15-for-27 for 297 passing yards and 4 passing touchdowns. He earned FedEx Air & Ground NFL Player of the Week, a couple of days after the San Francisco quarterback was honored with NFC Offensive Player of the Month for September.

== Career statistics ==
Legend
	Led the league
	NFL record
**Bold**	Career high

=== NFL ===
==== Regular season ====
Year	Team	Games			Passing									Rushing					Sacked		Fumbles	
Year	Team	GP	GS	Record	Cmp	Att	Pct	Yds	Y/A	Lng	TD	Int	Rtg	Att	Yds	Y/A	Lng	TD	Sck	SckY	Fum	Lost
2022	SF	9	5	**5–0**	114	170	67.1	1,374	8.1	54	13	4	107.3	22	13	0.6	13	1	11	84	0	0
2023	SF	16	16	12–4	**308**	444	**69.4**	**4,280**	**9.6**	76	**31**	11	**113.0**	39	144	3.7	17	2	28	153	6	2
2024	SF	15	15	6–9	300	**455**	65.9	3,864	8.5	76	20	**12**	96.1	**66**	**323**	4.9	16	**5**	**31**	**156**	**7**	**3**
2025	SF	9	9	7–2	197	284	**69.4**	2,167	7.6	45	20	10	100.5	33	147	4.5	26	3	11	53	3	2
2026	SF	9	9	8–1	185	264	70.1	2,369	9.0	**82**	20	5	115.2	41	222	**5.4**	**35**	2	13	67	0	0
Career		58	54	38–16	1,104	1,617	68.3	14,054	8.7	82	104	43	105.8	201	849	4.2	35	13	94	513	16	7

==== Postseason ====
Year	Team	Games			Passing									Rushing					Sacked		Fumbles	
Year	Team	GP	GS	Record	Cmp	Att	Pct	Yds	Y/A	Lng	TD	Int	Rtg	Att	Yds	Y/A	Lng	TD	Sck	SckY	Fum	Lost
2022	SF	3	3	**2–1**	41	63	**65.1**	569	**9.0**	**74**	**3**	0	**109.8**	7	24	3.4	13	**1**	**4**	**23**	1	**1**
2023	SF	3	3	**2–1**	**66**	**108**	61.1	**774**	7.2	51	**3**	1	88.3	**14**	**74**	**5.3**	**21**	0	**4**	20	0	0
2025	SF	2	2	1–1	33	58	56.9	402	6.9	61	2	**3**	68.3	**14**	61	4.4	18	0	3	21	**2**	**1**
Career		8	8	5–3	140	229	61.1	1,745	7.6	74	8	4	89.1	35	159	4.5	21	1	11	64	3	2

=== College ===
Season	Team	Games			Passing								Rushing			
Season	Team	GP	GS	Record	Comp	Att	Pct	Yards	Avg	TD	Int	Rate	Att	Yards	Avg	TD
2018	Iowa State	10	8	**6–2**	146	220	66.4	2,250	**10.2**	16	7	**169.9**	**100**	308	3.1	5
2019	Iowa State	13	13	7–6	**312**	**475**	65.7	**3,982**	8.4	**27**	**9**	151.1	93	249	2.7	**8**
2020	Iowa State	12	12	**9–3**	243	365	66.6	2,750	7.5	19	**9**	142.1	87	**382**	**4.4**	5
2021	Iowa State	13	13	7–6	292	407	**71.7**	3,188	7.8	19	8	149.0	85	238	2.8	1
Career		48	46	29–17	993	1,467	67.7	12,170	8.3	81	33	151.1	365	1,177	3.2	19

== Career highlights ==
=== Awards and honors ===
NFL

- NFC champion (2023)
- Pro Bowl (2023)
- NFL passer rating leader (2023)
- FedEx Air Player of the Year (2023)
- NFC Offensive Player of the Month (2026: September)
- 3× NFC Offensive Player of the Week (2023: Week 11, 2024: Week 16, 2026: Week 2)
- 3× FedEx Air Player of the Week (2023: Week 11, 13, 14)
- FedEx Air & Ground Player of the Week (2026: Week 3)
- PFWA All-Rookie Team (2022)
- NFL Top 100: 28th (2024), 85th (2026)

College

- 2× First-team All-Big 12 (2020, 2021)
- Second-team All-Big 12 (2019)

=== Records ===
==== NFL records ====
- Highest career passer rating: 104.8 (Note: Minimum 1,500 career passing attempts.)

== Personal life ==
Purdy is a devout Christian and openly talks about his faith. Purdy has stated in press briefings and interviews that Christianity plays a major role in his life. Purdy's favorite team as a youth was the Miami Dolphins, and he wears number 13 in honor of Dan Marino.

For his first two seasons in the NFL, Purdy lived with 49ers teammates Nick Zakelj and Alfredo Gutiérrez. Because he is a starter despite his draft status, Purdy has been nicknamed "Mr. Relevant."

Purdy has a younger brother, Chubba Purdy, who is a former college quarterback for Florida State, Nebraska, and Nevada.

In July 2023, Purdy announced his engagement to girlfriend Jenna Brandt. They got married on March 9, 2024. As of July 2025, they have one child. The couple announced in July 2026 that they are expecting their second child.
