= Gracen Halton =

American football player (born 2004)

No. 93 – San Francisco 49ers
- Position: Defensive tackle
- Roster status: Injured reserve

Personal information
- Born: January 27, 2004 (age 22); San Diego, California, U.S.
- Listed height: 6 ft 3 in (1.91 m)
- Listed weight: 293 lb (133 kg)

Career information
- High school: St. Augustine (San Diego)
- College: Oklahoma (2022–2025)
- NFL draft: 2026: 4th round, 107th overall pick

Career history
- San Francisco 49ers (2026–present)

Awards and highlights
- Second-team All-SEC (2025)

Career NFL statistics as of 2026
- Total tackles: 15
- Sacks: 2
- Forced fumbles: 1
- Fumble recoveries: 1
- Pass deflections: 1
- Defensive touchdowns: 1
- Stats at Pro Football Reference

Gracen Buford Halton (born January 27, 2004) is an American professional football defensive tackle for the San Francisco 49ers of the National Football League (NFL). He played college football for the Oklahoma Sooners and was selected by the 49ers in the fourth round of the 2026 NFL draft.

== Early life ==
Halton attended St. Augustine High School in San Diego, California. As a sophomore, he recorded 55 tackles, 3.5 sacks, two forced fumbles, and an interception. As a senior, Halton had 75 tackles and 5.5 sacks.

=== Recruiting ===
Coming out of high school, Halton was rated as a four-star recruit and originally committed to play college football for the Oregon Ducks over Arizona State, Nebraska, Penn State and USC. However, he later flipped his commitment to the Oklahoma Sooners on national signing day.

== College career ==
As a freshman in 2022, Halton recorded 10 tackles, with one going for a loss, in 10 games.

As a sophomore in 2023, Halton had 11 tackles with three and a half being for a loss in 11 games.

During the 2024 season opener, Halton recorded three tackles with two being for a loss, a sack and a half, and a forced fumble in a victory over Temple. In Week 2, he had two tackles for a loss, a sack, and a clutch safety, during a 16–12 victory over Houston. Halton finished his junior year 30 tackles with six being for a loss, five sacks, two forced fumbles, a fumble recovery, and a safety. Instead of declaring for the 2025 NFL draft, Halton decided to return to Oklahoma for his senior year.

== Professional career ==
Pre-draft measurables
Height	Weight	Arm length	Hand span	Wingspan	40-yard dash	10-yard split	20-yard split	20-yard shuttle	Three-cone drill	Vertical jump	Broad jump
6 ft 2 5/8 in (1.90 m)	293 lb (133 kg)	31 1/8 in (0.79 m)	10 in (0.25 m)	6 ft 5 1/4 in (1.96 m)	4.82 s	1.70 s	2.82 s	4.79 s	8.09 s	36.5 in (0.93 m)	9 ft 6 in (2.90 m)
All values from NFL Combine

Halton was selected by the San Francisco 49ers in the fourth round (107th overall) of the 2026 NFL draft.

Halton made his NFL debut during the season-opening against the Los Angeles Rams in Australia, but recorded no statistics in the 27–7 victory. In the next game against the Miami Dolphins, Halton recorded a season-high five combined tackles (three solo) during the 35–13 victory. The following week against the Arizona Cardinals, he had three combined tackles (two solo) and a pass deflection in the 36–30 victory.

During a Week 5 32–29 road victory over the Seattle Seahawks, Halton recorded three solo tackles, his first sack on Sam Darnold, and his first NFL touchdown after forcing a fumble and recovering the football in the end zone. In the next game against the Washington Commanders on Monday Night Football, Halton had a solo tackle and a sack during the 23–17 victory. Three weeks later against the Las Vegas Raiders, he suffered an ankle injury in the fourth quarter of the 38–17 victory and was carted off the field. It was later revealed that Halton broke his ankle, prematurely ending his season. Halton was placed on injured reserve on November 10, 2026.

Halton finished his rookie year with 15 combined tackles (nine solo), a pass deflection, a forced fumble, and a fumble recovery for a touchdown in eight games and seven starts.

== NFL career statistics ==
Legend
	Led the league
**Bold**	Career high

=== Regular season ===
Year	Team	Games		Tackles						Fumbles				Interceptions					
Year	Team	GP	GS	Comb	Solo	Ast	Sack	TFL	Sfty	FF	FR	Yds	TD	Int	Yds	Avg	Lng	TD	PD
2026	SF	8	7	15	9	6	2.0	5	0	1	1	0	1	0	0	0.0	0	0	1
Career		8	7	15	9	6	2.0	5	0	1	1	0	1	0	0	0.0	0	0	1
