= Nick Zakelj =

American football player (born 1999)

No. 63 – San Francisco 49ers
- Position: Guard
- Roster status: Injured reserve

Personal information
- Born: June 22, 1999 (age 27); Broadview Heights, Ohio, U.S.
- Listed height: 6 ft 6 in (1.98 m)
- Listed weight: 316 lb (143 kg)

Career information
- High school: Brecksville–Broadview Heights (Ohio)
- College: Fordham (2017–2021)
- NFL draft: 2022: 6th round, 187th overall pick

Career history
- San Francisco 49ers (2022–present)

Awards and highlights
- 3× First-team All-Patriot League (2019–2021); Second-team All-Patriot League (2018)

Career NFL statistics as of 2025
- Games played: 29
- Games started: 2
- Stats at Pro Football Reference

Nick Zakelj (born June 22, 1999) is an American professional football guard for the San Francisco 49ers of the National Football League (NFL). He played college football for the Fordham Rams.

== College career ==
Zakelj was a member of the Fordham Rams for five seasons. He became a starter at tackle during his freshman season. Zakelj was named first-team All-Patriot League in each of his final three seasons.

== Professional career ==
Pre-draft measurables
Height	Weight	Arm length	Hand span	Wingspan	40-yard dash	10-yard split	20-yard split	20-yard shuttle	Three-cone drill	Vertical jump	Broad jump	Bench press
6 ft 6 1/8 in (1.98 m)	316 lb (143 kg)	32 1/2 in (0.83 m)	9 7/8 in (0.25 m)	6 ft 6 3/8 in (1.99 m)	5.13 s	1.67 s	2.91 s	4.71 s	7.75 s	28.5 in (0.72 m)	9 ft 2 in (2.79 m)	27 reps
All values from NFL Combine

Zakelj was selected in the sixth round of the 2022 NFL draft by the San Francisco 49ers with the 187th overall pick. As a rookie, he appeared in five games.

On November 15, 2023, Zakelj was placed on injured reserve with a torn bicep.

On August 26, 2025, Zakelj was waived by the 49ers as part of final roster cuts and re-signed to the practice squad the next day.

On February 18, 2026, Zakelj signed a one-year extension with the 49ers. On August 10, Zakelj was released by the 49ers. He re–signed with the team on August 17. Zakelj was placed on season–ending injured reserve on August 30.

== Personal life ==
He has a bachelor's degree in finance and a master's degree in business analytics from Fordham.

Zakelj shares a house with 49ers teammate and starting quarterback Brock Purdy.
