= List of NFL career passer rating leaders =

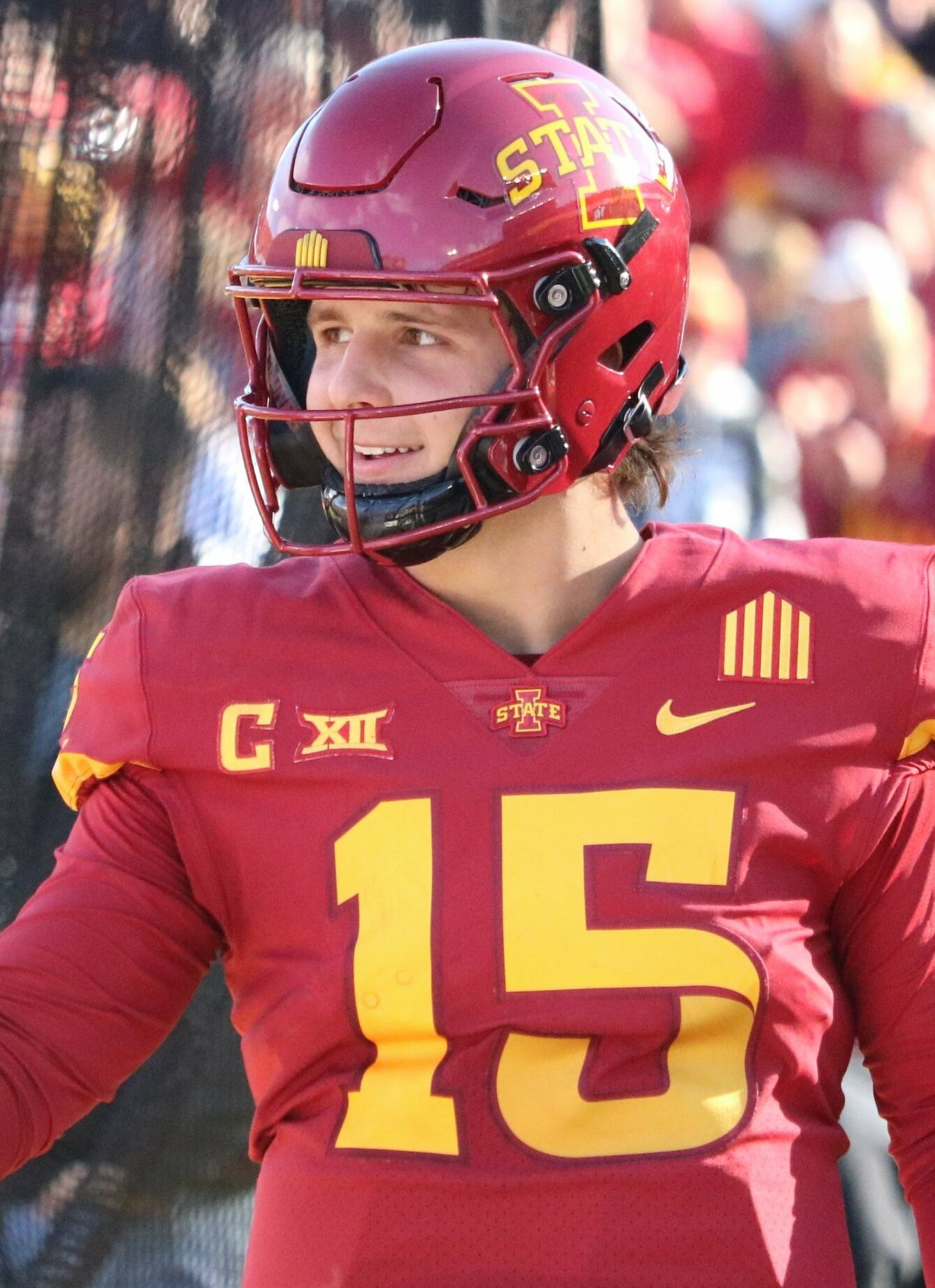
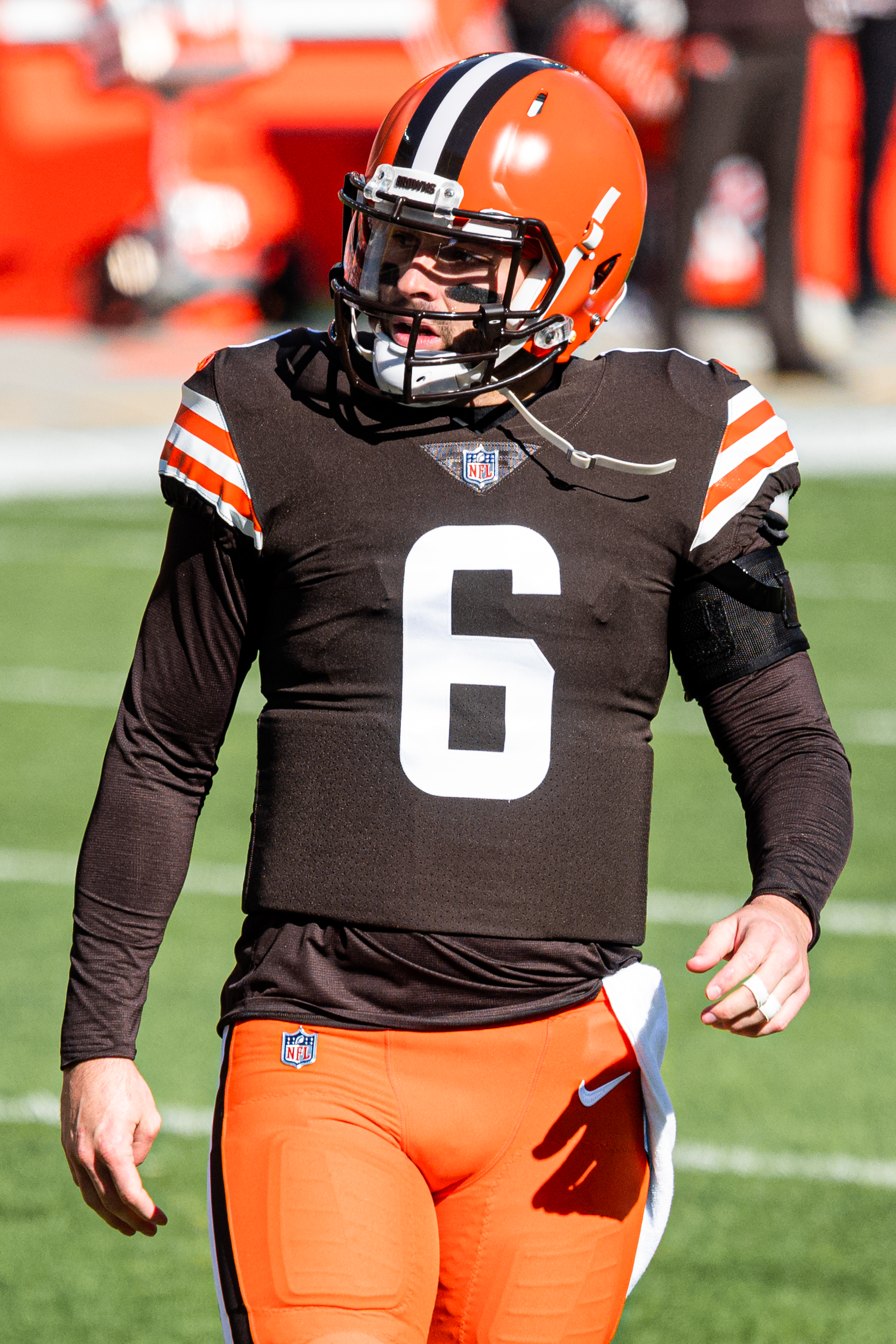
- Left: Brock Purdy is the all-time leader in career passer rating for the regular season.
- Right: Baker Mayfield is the all-time leader in career passer rating during the playoffs.

The NFL rates its passers for statistical purposes against a fixed performance standard based on statistical achievements of all qualified pro passers since 1960. The current passer rating system, which was adopted in 1973, removes inequities that existed in the former method and, at the same time, provides a means of comparing passing performances from one season to the next. According to the 2017 NFL Record & Fact Book, the system is used to rate passers, not quarterbacks. Statistics do not reflect leadership, play-calling, and other intangible factors that go into making a successful professional quarterback.

Four categories are used as a basis for compiling a rating:

- Percentage of completions per attempt
- Average yards gained per attempt
- Percentage of touchdown passes per attempt
- Percentage of interceptions per attempt

The average standard is 1.000. The bottom is .000. To earn a 2.000 rating, a passer must perform at exceptional levels, i.e., 70 percent in completions, 10 percent in touchdowns, 1.5 percent in interceptions, and 11 yards average gain per pass attempt. In order to make the rating more understandable, the point rating is then converted into a scale of 100, with 158.3 being the highest rating a passer can achieve. In cases where statistical performance has been superior, it is possible for a passer to surpass a 100 rating.
Quarterbacks are required to throw at least 1,500 passes before their ratings qualify for NFL career statistics for the regular season, and 150 attempts for the postseason.

== Regular season ==
Key
^ Inducted into the Pro Football Hall of Fame
* Active player

Quarterbacks must have at least 1,500 career attempts to qualify for this list.
Updated through Thursday, Week 11 of the 2026 season.

| Rank | Quarterback | Rating |
|---|---|---|
| 1 | Brock Purdy * | 105.8 |
| 2 | Joe Burrow * | 102.9 |
| 3 | Lamar Jackson * | 102.7 |
| 4 | Aaron Rodgers* | 101.6 |
| 5 | Patrick Mahomes * | 101.1 |
| 6 | Russell Wilson | 99.3 |
| 7 | Drew Brees ^ | 98.7 |
| 8 | Dak Prescott * | 98.2 |
| 9 | Deshaun Watson * | 97.7 |
| 10 | Jimmy Garoppolo | 97.6 |
| 11 | Jared Goff * | 97.3 |
| 11 | Tom Brady | 97.3 |
| 13 | Tony Romo | 97.1 |
| 14 | Kirk Cousins * | 96.8 |
| 14 | Jordan Love * | 96.8 |
| 14 | Steve Young ^ | 96.8 |
| 17 | Peyton Manning ^ | 96.5 |
| 18 | Tua Tagovailoa * | 96.2 |
| 19 | C. J. Stroud * | 95.4 |
| 20 | Philip Rivers | 95.0 |
| 21 | Justin Herbert * | 94.6 |
| 21 | Josh Allen * | 94.6 |
| 23 | Jalen Hurts * | 93.8 |
| 24 | Kurt Warner ^ | 93.7 |
| 25 | Matt Ryan | 93.6 |
| 26 | Ben Roethlisberger | 93.5 |
| 27 | Derek Carr | 92.8 |
| 28 | Matthew Stafford * | 92.4 |
| 29 | Joe Montana ^ | 92.3 |
| 30 | Kyler Murray * | 91.9 |
| 31 | Ryan Tannehill | 91.2 |
| 32 | Baker Mayfield * | 90.6 |
| 33 | Teddy Bridgewater | 90.3 |

| Rank | Quarterback | Rating |
|---|---|---|
| 34 | Chad Pennington | 90.1 |
| 34 | Marcus Mariota * | 90.1 |
| 36 | Andrew Luck | 89.5 |
| 36 | Matt Schaub | 89.5 |
| 38 | Colin Kaepernick ^ | 88.9 |
| 39 | Carson Wentz * | 88.8 |
| 40 | Trevor Lawrence * | 88.7 |
| 41 | Geno Smith * | 88.6 |
| 41 | Gardner Minshew * | 88.6 |
| 43 | Carson Palmer | 87.9 |
| 44 | Daunte Culpepper | 87.8 |
| 45 | Tyrod Taylor * | 87.7 |
| 46 | Jeff Garcia | 87.5 |
| 47 | Andy Dalton * | 87.4 |
| 48 | Alex Smith | 86.9 |
| 48 | Mac Jones * | 86.9 |
| 48 | Mitchell Trubisky * | 86.9 |
| 51 | Otto Graham ^ | 86.6 |
| 52 | Dan Marino ^ | 86.4 |
| 53 | Nick Foles | 86.2 |
| 54 | Brett Favre ^ | 86.0 |
| 54 | Trent Green | 86.0 |
| 54 | Sam Darnold * | 86.0 |
| 54 | Jameis Winston * | 86.0 |
| 58 | David Garrard | 85.8 |
| 59 | Donovan McNabb | 85.6 |
| 60 | Jacoby Brissett * | 85.5 |
| 61 | Jay Cutler | 85.3 |
| 62 | Cam Newton | 85.2 |
| 63 | Rich Gannon | 84.7 |
| 63 | Case Keenum * | 84.7 |
| 65 | Sam Bradford | 84.5 |

| Rank | Quarterback | Rating |
|---|---|---|
| 67 | Marc Bulger | 84.4 |
| 67 | Jim Kelly ^ | 84.4 |
| 69 | Joe Flacco * | 84.1 |
| 69 | Eli Manning | 84.1 |
| 69 | Daniel Jones * | 84.1 |
| 71 | Mark Brunell | 84.0 |
| 72 | Roger Staubach ^ | 83.4 |
| 73 | Steve McNair | 82.8 |
| 74 | Brian Griese | 82.7 |
| 74 | Neil Lomax | 82.7 |
| 74 | Bryce Young * | 82.7 |
| 77 | Len Dawson ^ | 82.6 |
| 77 | Sonny Jurgensen | 82.6 |
| 79 | Brad Johnson | 82.5 |
| 80 | Matt Hasselbeck | 82.4 |
| 81 | Ryan Fitzpatrick | 82.3 |
| 82 | Brian Hoyer | 82.0 |
| 83 | Ken Anderson | 81.9 |
| 84 | Bernie Kosar | 81.8 |
| 84 | Neil O'Donnell | 81.8 |
| 86 | Jason Campbell | 81.7 |
| 86 | Danny White | 81.7 |
| 88 | Troy Aikman ^ | 81.6 |
| 89 | Randall Cunningham | 81.5 |
| 89 | Dave Krieg | 81.5 |
| 91 | Jake Delhomme | 81.3 |
| 92 | Kyle Orton | 81.2 |
| 93 | Boomer Esiason | 81.1 |
| 94 | Warren Moon ^ | 80.9 |
| 95 | Blake Bortles | 80.6 |
| 96 | Bart Starr ^ | 80.5 |
| 96 | Jeff Hostetler | 80.5 |
| 98 | Jeff George | 80.4 |
| 98 | Ken O'Brien | 80.4 |
| 98 | Fran Tarkenton ^ | 80.4 |
| 98 | Michael Vick | 80.4 |

== Postseason ==
Quarterbacks must have at least 150 career postseason attempts to qualify for this list.

Updated through the 2025–26 NFL playoffs.

| Rank | Quarterback | Rating |
|---|---|---|
| 1 | * Baker Mayfield | 105.9 |
| 2 | * Patrick Mahomes | 105.4 |
| 3 | ^ Bart Starr | 104.8 |
| 4 | ^ Kurt Warner | 102.8 |
| 5 | * Josh Allen | 101.5 |
| 6 | Matt Ryan | 100.8 |
| 7 | * Matthew Stafford | 100.4 |
| 8 | Nick Foles | 98.8 |
| 9 | * Aaron Rodgers | 98.1 |
| 10 | Alex Smith | 97.4 |
| 11 | ^ Drew Brees | 97.1 |
| 12 | Russell Wilson | 96.8 |
| 13 | ^ Joe Montana | 95.6 |
| 14 | Mark Sanchez | 94.3 |
| 15 | * Joe Burrow | 93.8 |
| 16 | * Kirk Cousins | 93.7 |
| 17 | Ken Anderson | 93.5 |
| 18 | * Jalen Hurts | 93.4 |
| 19 | Tony Romo | 93.0 |
| 20 | * Dak Prescott | 91.8 |
| 21 | Joe Theismann | 91.4 |
| 22 | Tom Brady | 89.8 |
| 23 | * Brock Purdy | 89.1 |
| 24 | ^ Troy Aikman | 88.3 |
| 25 | * Joe Flacco | 87.9 |

| Rank | Quarterback | Rating |
|---|---|---|
| 26 | Cam Newton | 87.7 |
| 27 | ^ Peyton Manning | 87.4 |
| 27 | Eli Manning | 87.4 |
| 29 | Colin Kaepernick | 87.3 |
| 30 | Ben Roethlisberger | 86.7 |
| 31 | ^ Brett Favre | 86.3 |
| 32 | ^ Steve Young | 85.8 |
| 33 | Philip Rivers | 85.3 |
| 34 | * Jared Goff | 85.1 |
| 35 | ^ Warren Moon | 84.9 |
| 36 | Rich Gannon | 84.6 |
| 36 | * Lamar Jackson | 84.6 |
| 38 | Matt Hasselbeck | 84.2 |
| 38 | ^ Ken Stabler | 84.2 |
| 40 | Bernie Kosar | 83.5 |
| 41 | Jake Delhomme | 83.3 |
| 42 | ^ Terry Bradshaw | 83.0 |
| 43 | Jim Plunkett | 81.9 |
| 44 | Vinny Testaverde | 81.0 |
| 45 | * C. J. Stroud | 80.6 |
| 46 | Donovan McNabb | 80.0 |
| 47 | ^ John Elway | 79.7 |
| 48 | Daryle Lamonica | 77.9 |
| 49 | ^ Len Dawson | 77.4 |
| 50 | Chad Pennington | 77.3 |

== See also ==
- Passer rating
- List of National Football League career passing completions leaders
- List of National Football League career passing touchdowns leaders
- List of National Football League career passing yards leaders
- List of National Football League annual passer rating leaders
- List of National Football League annual passing touchdowns leaders
- List of National Football League annual passing yards leaders
- List of National Football League annual pass completion percentage leaders
