= List of NFL annual passer rating leaders =

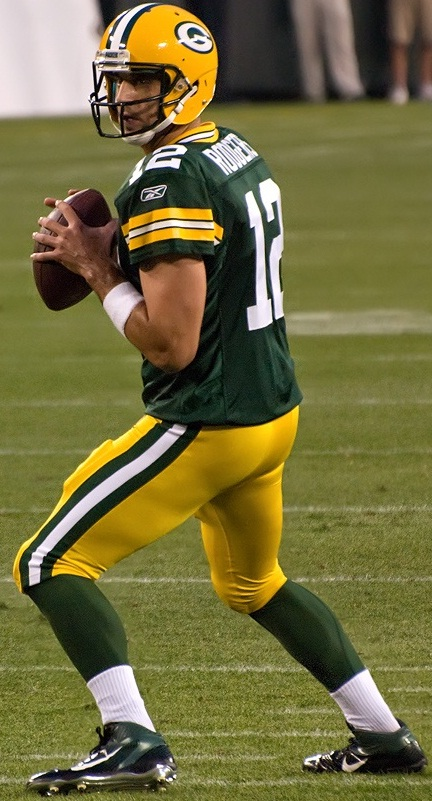
Aaron Rodgers holds the single-season passer rating record, achieving a rating of 122.5 in 2011.

In American football, passer rating is a measure of the performance of passers, primarily quarterbacks. Passer rating is calculated using a player's passing attempts, completions, passing yards, passing touchdowns, and interceptions. Passer rating in the National Football League (NFL) is measured on a scale from 0 to 158.3, with a higher passer rating reflecting a stronger overall performance. Passer rating is sometimes colloquially referred to as "quarterback rating" or "QB rating", however the statistic applies only to passing (not to other contributions by a quarterback) and applies to any player at any position who throws a forward pass, not just to quarterbacks.

The NFL did not begin keeping official records until the 1932 season. In addition to the overall NFL passer rating leaders, league record books recognize the passer rating leaders of the American Football League (AFL), which operated from 1960 to 1969 before being absorbed into the NFL in 1970. The NFL also recognizes the statistics of the All-America Football Conference, which operated from 1946 to 1949 before three of its teams were merged into the NFL, since 2025.

The single-season passer rating record is held by Aaron Rodgers who had a rating of 122.5 in 2011 with the Green Bay Packers. Steve Young has led the NFL in passer rating a record six different times while Len Dawson achieved the same feat in the AFL.

Young also owns the longest streak of NFL passer-rating titles, pacing the league for four consecutive seasons from 1991 through 1994. Dawson holds the overall professional-football mark, leading the AFL for five straight seasons between 1964 and 1968.

Young and Dawson therefore share the record for the most seasons finishing atop a major professional league leaderboard at six each. Four other quarterbacks—Ken Anderson, Aaron Rodgers, Bart Starr, and Roger Staubach—are tied for the next-most seasons with four apiece.

== NFL annual passer rating leaders ==
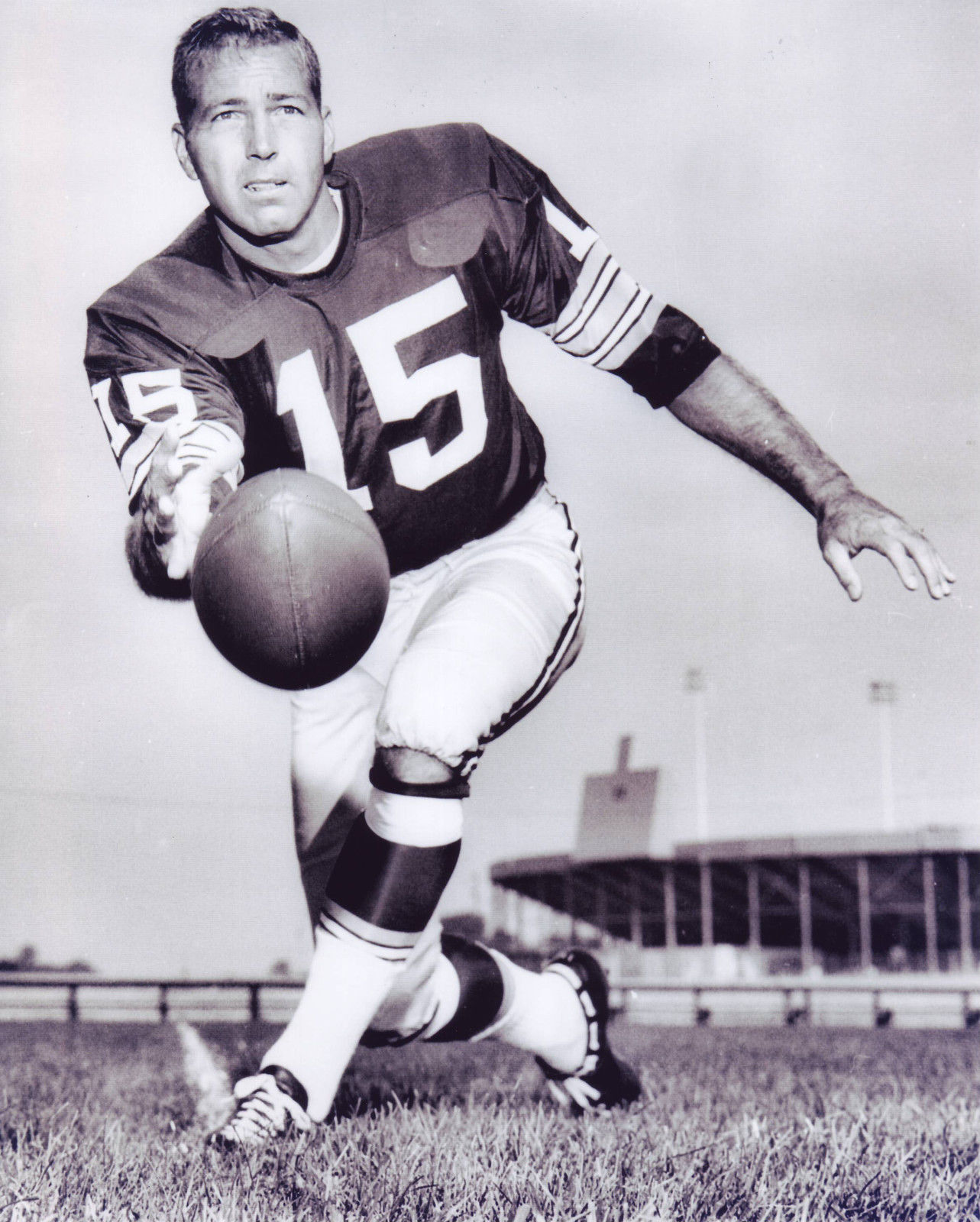
Bart Starr led the league in passer rating four times during the 1960s.

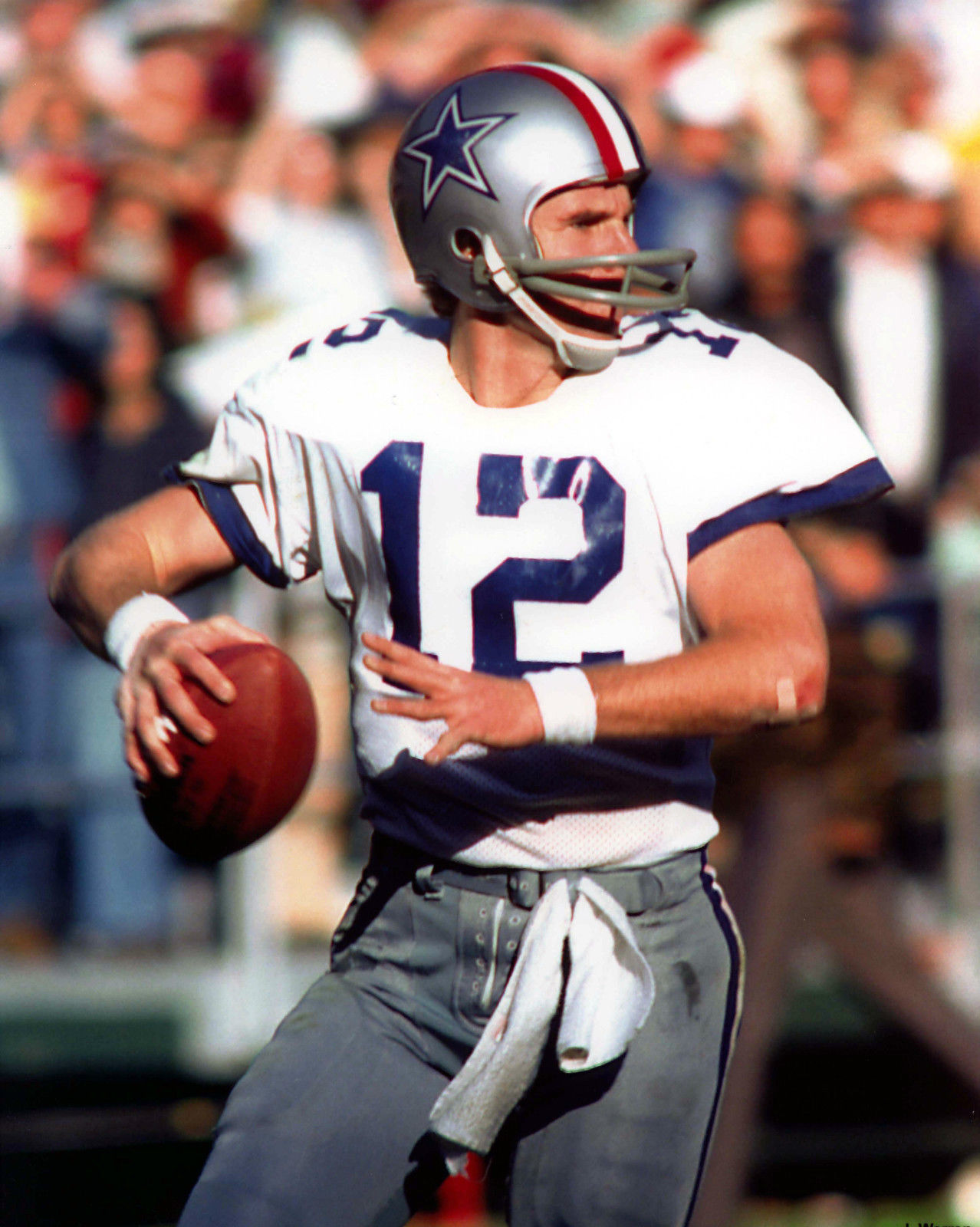
Roger Staubach led the NFL in passer rating four times in his 11 year career.

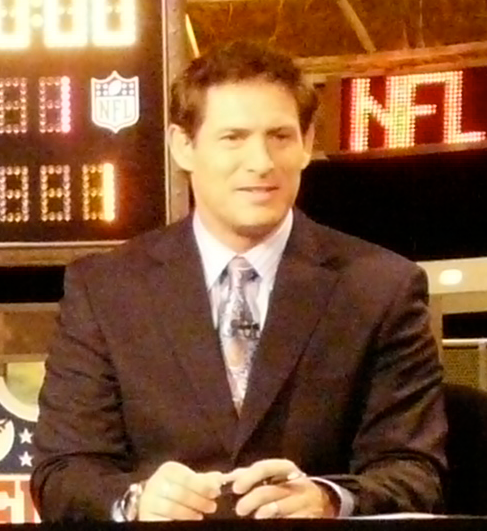
Steve Young led the league in passer rating a record six times and is the only player to do so in four consecutive seasons.

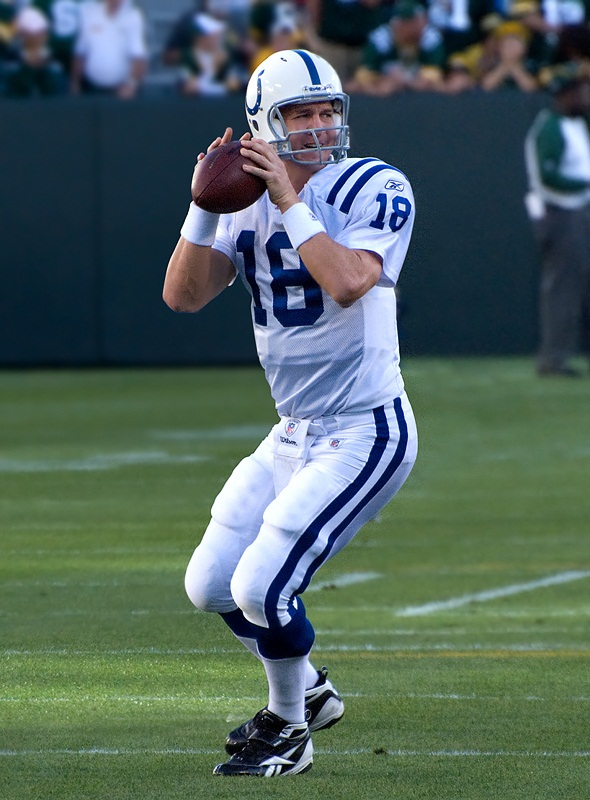
Peyton Manning led the league for three consecutive seasons during the 2000s.

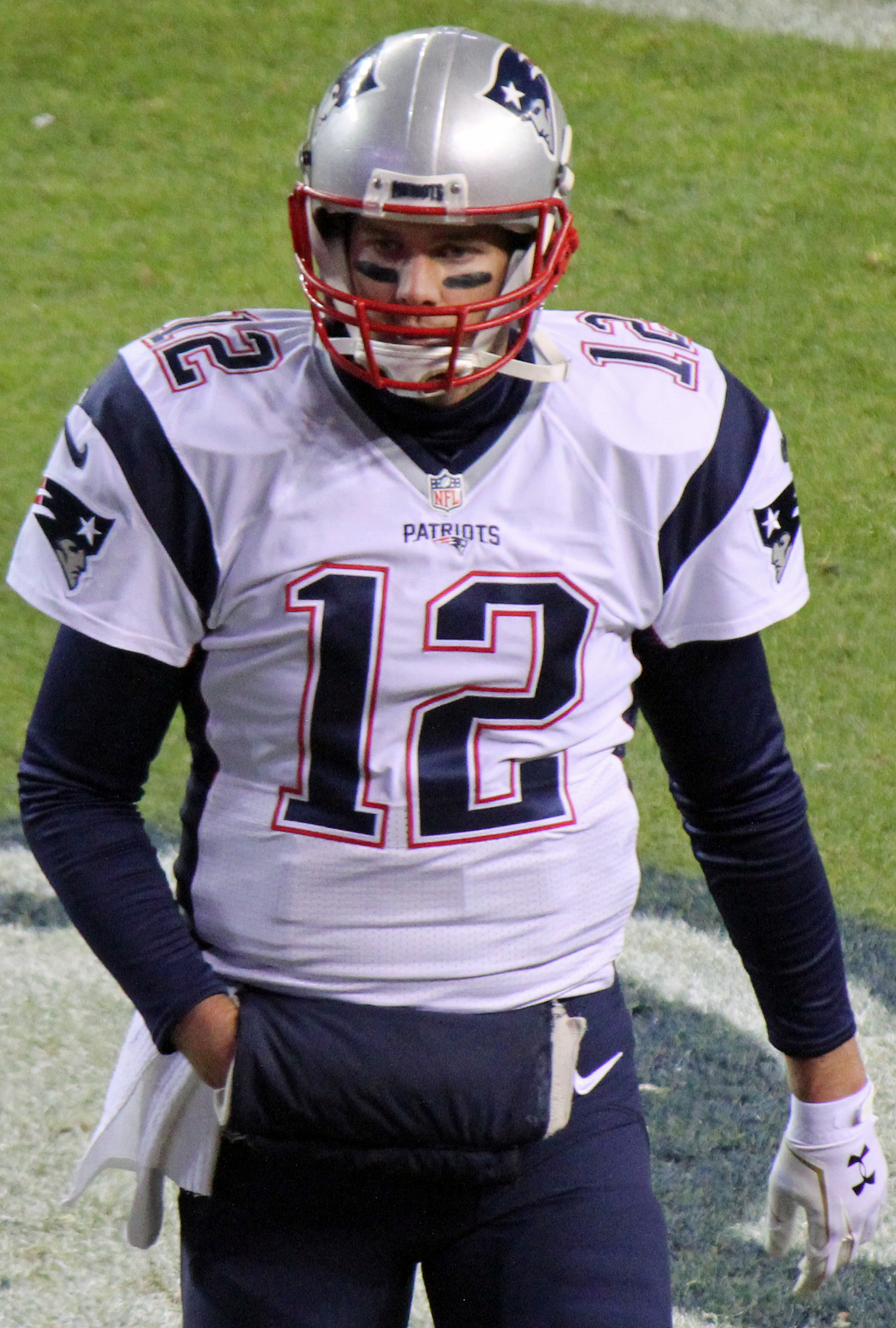
Tom Brady has led the league in passer rating twice.

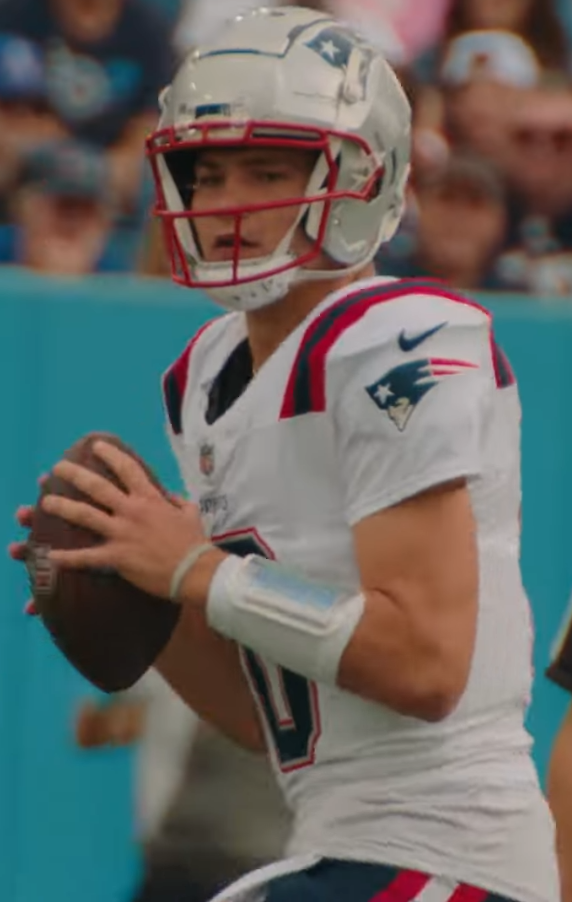
Drake Maye is the most recent passer leader, having led the league with a 113.5 passer rating in the 2025 season.

Key
Symbol	Meaning
Leader	The player who recorded the highest passer rating in the NFL
Rate	The passer rating of the player
GP	The number of games played by a player during the season
†	Pro Football Hall of Fame member
^	The player is an active player
*	Player set the single-season passer rating record
(#)	Denotes the number of times a player appears in this list

NFL annual passer rating leaders by season
Season	Player	Rate (Note: To qualify, a player must meet a minimum number of pass attempts per team game. 10 attempts per team game for seasons prior to 1975, 12 attempts per team game for the 1976 and 1977 seasons, and 14 attempts per team game from the 1978 season onwards.)	GP	Team	Refs
1934	Arnie Herber†	45.1*	11	Green Bay Packers	
1935	No player met the minimum threshold				
1936	Arnie Herber† (2)	58.9*	12	Green Bay Packers	
1937	Ed Danowski	72.8*	11	New York Giants	
1938	Ed Danowski (2)	66.9	11	New York Giants	
1939	Arnie Herber† (3)	61.6	10	Green Bay Packers	
1940	Sammy Baugh†	85.6*	11	Washington Redskins	
1941	Sid Luckman†	95.3*	11	Chicago Bears	
1942	Cecil Isbell	87.0	11	Green Bay Packers	
1943	Sid Luckman† (2)	107.5*	10	Chicago Bears	
1944	Frank Filchock	86.0	10	Washington Redskins	
1945	Sammy Baugh† (2)	109.9*	10	Washington Redskins	
1946	Sid Luckman† (3)	71.0	11	Chicago Bears	
1947	Sammy Baugh† (3)	92.0	12	Washington Redskins	
1948	Tommy Thompson	98.4	12	Philadelphia Eagles	
1949	Tommy Thompson (2)	84.4	12	Philadelphia Eagles	
1950	Norm Van Brocklin†	85.1	12	Los Angeles Rams	
1951	Bob Waterfield†	81.8	11	Los Angeles Rams	
1952	Tobin Rote	85.6	12	Green Bay Packers	
1953	Otto Graham†	99.7	12	Cleveland Browns	
1954	Adrian Burk	80.4	12	Philadelphia Eagles	
1955	Otto Graham† (2)	94.0	12	Cleveland Browns	
1956	Ed Brown	83.1	12	Chicago Bears	
1957	Johnny Unitas†	88.0	12	Baltimore Colts	
1958	Johnny Unitas† (2)	90.0	10	Baltimore Colts	
1959	Charlie Conerly	102.7	10	New York Giants	
1960	Milt Plum	110.4*	12	Cleveland Browns	
1961	Bill Wade	93.7	13	Chicago Bears	
1962	Eddie LeBaron	95.4	14	Dallas Cowboys	
1963	Y. A. Tittle†	104.8	13	New York Giants	
1964	Bart Starr†	97.1	14	Green Bay Packers	
1965	Johnny Unitas† (3)	97.4	11	Baltimore Colts	
1966	Bart Starr† (2)	105.0	14	Green Bay Packers	
1967	Sonny Jurgensen†	87.3	14	Washington Redskins	
1968	Bart Starr† (3)	104.3	12	Green Bay Packers	
1969	Bart Starr† (4)	89.9	12	Green Bay Packers	
1970	John Brodie	93.8	14	San Francisco 49ers	
1971	Roger Staubach†	104.8	13	Dallas Cowboys	
1972	Earl Morrall	91.0	14	Miami Dolphins	
1973	Roger Staubach† (2)	94.6	14	Dallas Cowboys	
1974	Ken Anderson	95.7	13	Cincinnati Bengals	
1975	Ken Anderson (2)	93.9	14	Cincinnati Bengals	
1976	Ken Stabler†	103.4	12	Oakland Raiders	
1977	Bob Griese†	87.8	14	Miami Dolphins	
1978	Roger Staubach† (3)	84.9	15	Dallas Cowboys	
1979	Roger Staubach† (4)	92.3	16	Dallas Cowboys	
1980	Brian Sipe	91.4	16	Cleveland Browns	
1981	Ken Anderson (3)	98.4	16	Cincinnati Bengals	
1982	Ken Anderson (4)	95.3	9	Cincinnati Bengals	
1983	Steve Bartkowski	97.6	14	Atlanta Falcons	
1984	Dan Marino†	108.9	16	Miami Dolphins	
1985	Ken O'Brien	96.2	16	New York Jets	
1986	Tommy Kramer	92.6	13	Minnesota Vikings	
1987	Joe Montana†	102.1	13	San Francisco 49ers	
1988	Boomer Esiason	97.4	16	Cincinnati Bengals	
1989	Joe Montana† (2)	112.4*	13	San Francisco 49ers	
1990	Jim Kelly†	101.2	14	Buffalo Bills	
1991	Steve Young†	101.8	11	San Francisco 49ers	
1992	Steve Young† (2)	107.0	16	San Francisco 49ers	
1993	Steve Young† (3)	101.5	16	San Francisco 49ers	
1994	Steve Young† (4)	112.8*	16	San Francisco 49ers	
1995	Jim Harbaugh	100.7	15	Indianapolis Colts	
1996	Steve Young† (5)	97.2	12	San Francisco 49ers	
1997	Steve Young† (6)	104.7	15	San Francisco 49ers	
1998	Randall Cunningham	106.0	15	Minnesota Vikings	
1999	Kurt Warner†	109.2	16	St. Louis Rams	
2000	Brian Griese	102.9	10	Denver Broncos	
2001	Kurt Warner† (2)	101.4	16	St. Louis Rams	
2002	Chad Pennington	104.2	15	New York Jets	
2003	Steve McNair	100.4	14	Tennessee Titans	
2004	Peyton Manning†	121.1*	16	Indianapolis Colts	
2005	Peyton Manning† (2)	104.1	16	Indianapolis Colts	
2006	Peyton Manning† (3)	101.0	16	Indianapolis Colts	
2007	Tom Brady	117.2	16	New England Patriots	
2008	Philip Rivers	105.5	16	San Diego Chargers	
2009	Drew Brees†	109.6	15	New Orleans Saints	
2010	Tom Brady (2)	111.0	16	New England Patriots	
2011	Aaron Rodgers^	122.5*	15	Green Bay Packers	
2012	Aaron Rodgers^ (2)	108.0	16	Green Bay Packers	
2013	Nick Foles	119.2	13	Philadelphia Eagles	
2014	Tony Romo	113.2	15	Dallas Cowboys	
2015	Russell Wilson	110.1	16	Seattle Seahawks	
2016	Matt Ryan	117.1	16	Atlanta Falcons	
2017	Alex Smith	104.7	15	Kansas City Chiefs	
2018	Drew Brees† (2)	115.7	15	New Orleans Saints	
2019	Ryan Tannehill	117.5	12	Tennessee Titans	
2020	Aaron Rodgers^ (3)	121.5	16	Green Bay Packers	
2021	Aaron Rodgers^ (4)	111.9	16	Green Bay Packers	
2022	Tua Tagovailoa^	105.5	13	Miami Dolphins	
2023	Brock Purdy^	113.0	16	San Francisco 49ers	
2024	Lamar Jackson^	119.6	17	Baltimore Ravens	
2025	Drake Maye^	113.5	17	New England Patriots	

== AFL annual passer rating leaders ==
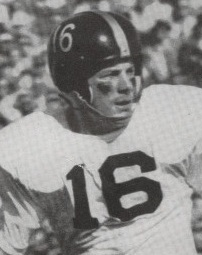
Len Dawson led the AFL in passer rating a record six times.

Key
Symbol	Meaning
Leader	The player who recorded the highest passer rating in the AFL
Rate	The passer rating of the player
GP	The number of games played by a player during the season
†	Pro Football Hall of Fame member
*	Player set the single-season passer rating record
(#)	Denotes the number of times a player appears in this list

AFL annual passer rating leaders by season
Season	Player	Rate (Note: To qualify, a player must have made a minimum of 10 pass attempts per team game.)	GP	Team	Refs
1960	Tom Flores†	71.8*	14	Oakland Raiders	
1961	George Blanda†	91.3*	14	Houston Oilers	
1962	Len Dawson†	98.3*	14	Dallas Texans	
1963	Tobin Rote	86.7	14	San Diego Chargers	
1964	Len Dawson† (2)	89.9	14	Kansas City Chiefs	
1965	Len Dawson† (3)	81.3	14	Kansas City Chiefs	
1966	Len Dawson† (4)	101.7*	14	Kansas City Chiefs	
1967	Len Dawson† (5)	83.7	14	Kansas City Chiefs	
1968	Len Dawson† (6)	98.6	14	Kansas City Chiefs	
1969	Greg Cook	88.3	11	Cincinnati Bengals	

== AAFC annual passer rating leaders ==
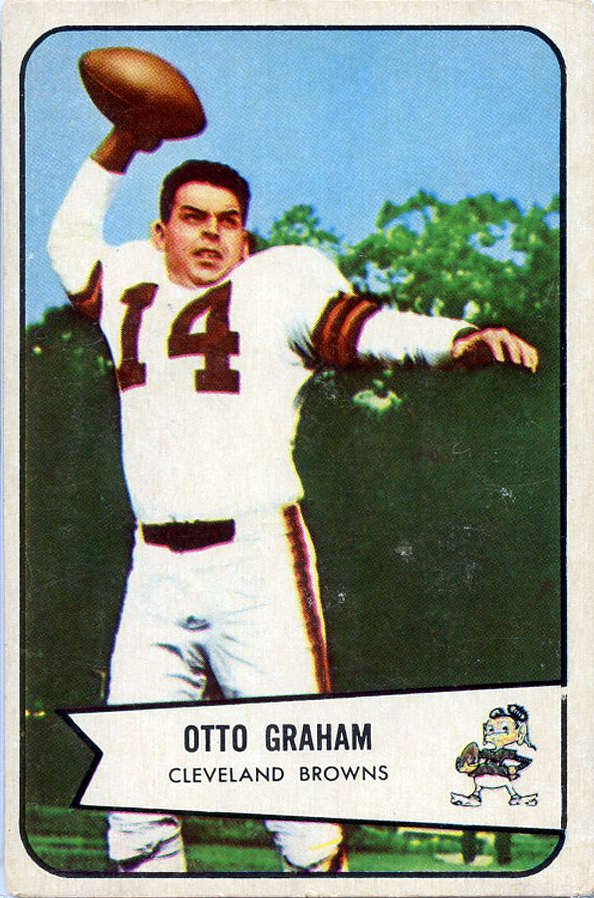
Across two different leagues, Otto Graham was the leader in passer rating five times. His passer rating of 112.1 in his rookie season of 1946 was the highest in pro football history until 1989.

Key
Symbol	Meaning
Leader	The player who recorded the best passer rating in the AAFC
Rate	The passer rating of the player
GP	The number of games played by a player during the season
†	Pro Football Hall of Fame member
*	Player set the single-season passing yards record
(#)	Denotes the number of times a player appears in this list

AAFC annual passer rating leaders by season
Season	Player	Rate (Note: To qualify, a player must have made a minimum of 10 pass attempts per team game.)	GP	Team	Refs
1946	Otto Graham†	112.1	14	Cleveland Browns	
1947	Otto Graham† (2)	109.2	14	Cleveland Browns	
1948	Frankie Albert	102.9	14	San Francisco 49ers	
1949	Otto Graham† (3)	97.5	12	Cleveland Browns	

== Most seasons leading the league ==
Count	Player	Seasons	Team(s)	Refs
6	Len Dawson	1962, 1964–1968	Dallas Texans (1) / Kansas City Chiefs (5)	
6	Steve Young	1991–1994, 1996, 1997	San Francisco 49ers	
5	Otto Graham	1946, 1947, 1949, 1953, 1955 (Note: AAFC statistics for Graham's AAFC seasons (1946 to 1949) were not recognized by the NFL until 2025.)	Cleveland Browns	
4	Ken Anderson	1974, 1975, 1981, 1982	Cincinnati Bengals	
4	Aaron Rodgers	2011, 2012, 2020, 2021	Green Bay Packers	
4	Bart Starr	1964, 1966, 1968, 1969	Green Bay Packers	
4	Roger Staubach	1971, 1973, 1978, 1979	Dallas Cowboys	
3	Sammy Baugh	1940, 1945, 1947	Washington Redskins	
3	Arnie Herber	1934, 1936, 1939	Green Bay Packers	
3	Sid Luckman	1941, 1943, 1946	Chicago Bears	
3	Peyton Manning	2004–2006	Indianapolis Colts	
3	Johnny Unitas	1957, 1958, 1965	Baltimore Colts	
2	Tom Brady	2007, 2010	New England Patriots	
2	Drew Brees	2009, 2018	New Orleans Saints	
2	Ed Danowski	1937, 1938	New York Giants	
2	Joe Montana	1987, 1989	San Francisco 49ers	
2	Tommy Thompson	1948, 1949	Philadelphia Eagles	
2	Kurt Warner	1999, 2001	St. Louis Rams	

== See also ==
- List of NFL career passer rating leaders
- List of NFL annual passing touchdowns leaders
- List of NFL annual passing yards leaders
- List of NFL annual pass completion percentage leaders
