= Titus Leo =

American football player (born 1999)

Profile
- Position: Linebacker

Personal information
- Born: August 26, 1999 (age 27); Brooklyn, New York, U.S.
- Listed height: 6 ft 3 in (1.91 m)
- Listed weight: 245 lb (111 kg)

Career information
- High school: Sheepshead Bay (Brooklyn)
- College: Wagner (2018–2022)
- NFL draft: 2023: 6th round, 211th overall pick

Career history
- Indianapolis Colts (2023–2024); New England Patriots (2024); Tennessee Titans (2025)*; Cleveland Browns (2025)*; Philadelphia Eagles (2025)*; San Francisco 49ers (2026)*
- * Offseason or practice squad member only

Awards and highlights
- First-team FCS All-American (2021); First-team All-NEC (2020–21, 2021, 2022); NEC Defensive Player of the Year (2020–21, 2021)

Career NFL statistics as of 2024
- Total tackles: 4
- Pass deflections: 1
- Stats at Pro Football Reference

Titus Leo (born August 26, 1999) is an American professional football linebacker. He played college football for the Wagner Seahawks and was selected by the Indianapolis Colts in the sixth round of the 2023 NFL draft. He has also played for the New England Patriots.

== Early life ==
Leo was born on August 26, 1999, and grew up in Sheepshead Bay, New York. He attended Sheepshead Bay High School and was an all-around player, seeing action on offense (wide receiver), defense (linebacker, safety) and occasionally playing kicker and punter on special teams. He committed to play college football for the Wagner Seahawks, the only Division I team to give him an offer.

== College career ==
Leo played five seasons for Wagner: 2018 to 2022. He totaled 234 tackles, 40 of which were for a loss, 13 sacks and six forced fumbles while playing linebacker. He was twice named the Northeast Conference Defensive Player of the Year and was named first-team all-conference in his final three seasons. Following the 2021 season, he was chosen first-team FCS All-American.

== Professional career ==
Pre-draft measurables
Height	Weight	Arm length	Hand span	Wingspan	40-yard dash	10-yard split	20-yard split	20-yard shuttle	Three-cone drill	Vertical jump	Broad jump	Bench press
6 ft 3 3/8 in (1.91 m)	243 lb (110 kg)	34 1/8 in (0.87 m)	10 1/8 in (0.26 m)	6 ft 9 5/8 in (2.07 m)	4.69 s	1.57 s	2.60 s	4.37 s	7.30 s	34.0 in (0.86 m)	10 ft 9 in (3.28 m)	20 reps
All values from Pro Day

=== Indianapolis Colts ===
Leo was selected in the sixth round (211th overall) of the 2023 NFL draft by the Indianapolis Colts, only the fourth player in Wagner history to be drafted. He was placed on injured reserve on August 29, 2023.

Leo was waived by the Colts on August 27, 2024, and re-signed to the practice squad.

=== New England Patriots ===
On November 19, 2024, Leo was signed to the New England Patriots' active roster off of the Colts' practice squad.

On April 28, 2025, Leo was released by the Patriots.

=== Tennessee Titans ===
On April 29, 2025, Leo was claimed off waivers by the Tennessee Titans. He was waived on August 5.

=== Cleveland Browns ===
On August 12, 2025, Leo signed with the Cleveland Browns. He was waived on August 24.

=== Philadelphia Eagles ===
On October 15, 2025, Leo signed with the Philadelphia Eagles' practice squad. He was released on October 27. On November 13, Leo was re-signed to the practice squad. He was waived and re-signed to the practice squad on December 4. He was released on December 30.

=== San Francisco 49ers ===
On August 2, 2026, Leo signed a one-year contract with the San Francisco 49ers. He was waived/injured by San Francisco on August 18.
