= 2017 San Francisco 49ers season =

American football team season

- Owner: Jed York
- General manager: John Lynch
- Head coach: Kyle Shanahan
- Offensive coordinator: Kyle Shanahan (de facto)
- Defensive coordinator: Robert Saleh
- Home stadium: Levi's Stadium

Results
- Record: 6–10
- Division place: 4th NFC West
- Playoffs: Did not qualify
- Pro Bowlers: FB Kyle Juszczyk; OT Joe Staley

Uniform
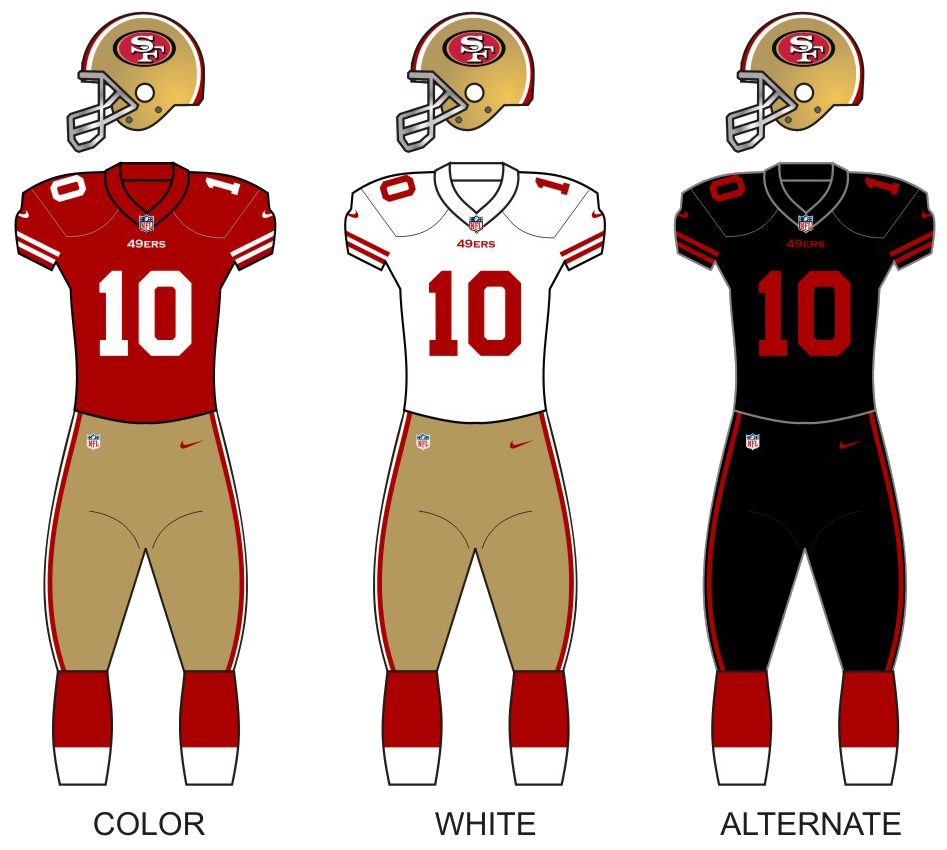

The 2017 season was the San Francisco 49ers' 68th in the National Football League (NFL), their 72nd overall, their fourth playing their home games at Levi's Stadium and their first under the head coach/general manager tandem of Kyle Shanahan and John Lynch. This season began with the team's fourth head coach in as many seasons.

After an 0–9 start, they had a late season charge and won 6 of their last 7 games to finish the season 6–10, improving from their last two season records. Despite this, the 49ers were eliminated from playoff contention in Week 12.

The 49ers season largely turned around after they acquired quarterback Jimmy Garoppolo from the New England Patriots on October 30, 2017. At this point, the 49ers had a record of 0–8, dead last in the NFC. Garoppolo made his first start during Week 13 against the Chicago Bears and led them to a 15–14 win. Garoppolo won the final five games of the season for the 49ers, bringing the regular-season record to 6–10, the most wins by the team since the 2014 season. During the 5-game win streak, the 49ers won 3 straight games over teams that eventually made the playoffs (Weeks 15–17 against the Tennessee Titans, Jacksonville Jaguars, and Los Angeles Rams). From Weeks 1–12, the 49ers scored just 187 points (17 points per game), which was in the bottom half of the league. During the 5-game win streak, the 49ers offense scored 144 points (28.8 points per game). The highlight of the year was during Week 16, the 49ers scored 44 points against the Jacksonville Jaguars, who had the NFL's top scoring defense at the time, allowing just 14.9 points per game. The 49ers finished the season by being the only team in the NFL to go undefeated in the month of December. The 49ers also became the first team in NFL history to start a season 0–9 and finish with more than three wins.

== Offseason ==
=== Coaching changes ===
Owner Jed York announced that he would hire a new general manager and the new head coach due to a bad season. On January 29, 2017, the 49ers hired John Lynch as their general manager. On February 6, 2017, the 49ers hired Atlanta Falcons' offensive coordinator Kyle Shanahan as the new coach of the San Francisco 49ers.

=== Roster changes ===
==== Free agency ====
The 49ers entered free agency with the following:

Position	Player	Free agency tag	Date signed	2017 Team	Notes
NT	Glenn Dorsey	UFA			
K	Phil Dawson	UFA	March 10, 2017	Arizona Cardinals	Agreed 2-year contract
QB	Blaine Gabbert	UFA	May 10, 2017	Arizona Cardinals	Signed one-year contract
ILB	Michael Wilhoite	UFA	March 24, 2017	Seattle Seahawks	Signed one-year contract
DE	Tony Jerod-Eddie	UFA			
RB	Shaun Draughn	UFA	March 22, 2017	New York Giants	Signed one-year contract
WR	Jeremy Kerley	UFA	March 4, 2017	San Francisco 49ers	Agreed 3-year contract
ILB	Nick Bellore	UFA	April 3, 2017	Detroit Lions	Signed one-year contract
WR	Rod Streater	UFA		Buffalo Bills	
QB	Christian Ponder	UFA			
QB	Thad Lewis	UFA		Baltimore Ravens	
TE	Jim Dray	UFA			
G	Andrew Gardner	UFA	August 14, 2017	San Francisco 49ers	Signed one-year contract
RB	DuJuan Harris	UFA	March 28, 2017	San Francisco 49ers	Signed one-year contract
DT	Chris Jones	RFA	March 16, 2017	San Francisco 49ers	Agreed one-year contract
ILB	Gerald Hodges	UFA	May 25, 2017	Buffalo Bills	Signed one-year contract
WR	Quinton Patton	UFA	March 23, 2017	New York Jets	Signed one-year contract
ILB	Carl Bradford	RFA	February 27, 2017	Buffalo Bills	Declined one-year contract
FS	Marcus Cromartie	RFA	April 7, 2017	Buffalo Bills	
G	Andrew Tiller	RFA	May 10, 2017	Kansas City Chiefs	
CB	Chris Davis	RFA			
WR	Chris Harper	ERFA	May 30, 2017	New York Jets	
SS	Marcus Ball	ERFA	May 25, 2017	Toronto Argonauts	
DE	Zach Moore	ERFA		Carolina Panthers	
ILB	Shayne Skov	ERFA	August 17, 2017	San Francisco 49ers	Signed one-year contract
TE	Je'Ron Hamm	ERFA			
NT	Mike Purcell	RFA	February 27, 2017	Los Angeles Rams	Declined one-year contract
CB	JaCorey Shepherd	ERFA	August 5, 2017	Pittsburgh Steelers	
RFA: Restricted free agent, UFA: Unrestricted free agent, ERFA: Exclusive rights free agent LEGEND – Light green background indicates a player has been re-signed by the 49ers. – Light red background indicates a player has departed the 49ers.

==== Signings ====
Position	Player	2016 Team	Date signed	Notes
CB	K'Waun Williams		February 21, 2017	Signed 1-year
WR	DeAndre Carter	New England Patriots	February 24, 2017	Signed 2-year
DT	Earl Mitchell	Miami Dolphins	February 24, 2017	Signed 4-year
WR	Pierre Garçon	Washington Redskins	March 9, 2017	Signed 5-year
WR	Marquise Goodwin	Buffalo Bills	March 9, 2017	Signed 2-year
K	Robbie Gould	New York Giants	March 9, 2017	Signed 2-year
QB	Brian Hoyer	Chicago Bears	March 9, 2017	Signed 2-year
FB	Kyle Juszczyk	Baltimore Ravens	March 9, 2017	Signed 4-year
TE	Logan Paulsen	Chicago Bears	March 9, 2017	Signed 1-year
LB	Malcolm Smith	Oakland Raiders	March 9, 2017	Signed 5-year
QB	Matt Barkley	Chicago Bears	March 10, 2017	Signed 2-year
LB	Brock Coyle	Seattle Seahawks	March 10, 2017	Signed 1-year
WR	Aldrick Robinson	Atlanta Falcons	March 10, 2017	Signed 2-year
S	Don Jones	Houston Texans	March 10, 2017	Signed 2-year
LB	Dekoda Watson	Denver Broncos	March 17, 2017	Signed 3-year
RB	Tim Hightower	New Orleans Saints	April 4, 2017	Signed 1-year
OT	Garry Gilliam	Seattle Seahawks	April 18, 2017	Signed 1-year
C	Tim Barnes	Los Angeles Rams	May 2, 2017	Signed 1-year
G	Brandon Fusco	Minnesota Vikings	May 2, 2017	Signed 1-year
CB	Will Davis	Baltimore Ravens	June 1, 2017	Signed 1-year
LB	Elvis Dumervil	Baltimore Ravens	June 5, 2017	
OT	Andrew Lauderdale		June 9, 2017	Signed 2-year
WR	Tim Patrick		July 31, 2017	Claimed off waiver
WR	Louis Murphy	Tampa Bay Buccaneers	July 31, 2017	Signed 1-year
CB	Asa Jackson	Detroit Lions	August 8, 2017	
LB	Sean Porter	Jacksonville Jaguars	August 9, 2017	
DE	Leger Douzable	Buffalo Bills	August 14, 2017	Signed 1-year contract
DT	Sen'Derrick Marks	Miami Dolphins	August 23, 2017	Signed 1-year contract
LB	Mark Nzeocha	Dallas Cowboys	September 25, 2017	Signed 1-year contract

Indicates that the player was a free agent at the end of his respective team's 2016 season.

==== Departures ====
Position	Player	Date	Notes
WR	Torrey Smith	March 7, 2017	Released
S	Antoine Bethea	March 7, 2017	Released
C	Marcus Martin	March 8, 2017	Waived
C	Alex Balducci	May 2, 2017	Released
S	Marcus Ball	May 2, 2017	Released
LB	Carl Bradford	May 2, 2017	Released
LB	Jayson DiManche	May 2, 2017	Released
TE	Je'Ron Hamm	May 2, 2017	Released
WR	Chris Harper	May 2, 2017	Released
LB	Wynton McManis	May 2, 2017	Released
P	Brock Miller	May 2, 2017	Released
DE	Zach Moore	May 2, 2017	Released
NT	Mike Purcell	May 2, 2017	Released
WR	Eric Rogers	May 2, 2017	Released
CB	JaCorey Shepherd	May 2, 2017	Released
LB	Shayne Skov	May 2, 2017	Released
RB	Mike Davis	May 5, 2017	Waived
RB	DuJuan Harris	May 8, 2017	Released
WR	Rashad Ross	June 1, 2017	Waived
WR	Bruce Ellington	August 3, 2017	Waived
C	Jeremy Zuttah	August 9, 2017	Released
LB	Ahmad Brooks	August 25, 2017	Released
LB	Sean Porter	August 29, 2017	Released
QB	Matt Barkley	September 1, 2017	Released
C	Tim Barnes	September 1, 2017	Released
CB	Will Davis	September 1, 2017	Released
DE	Leger Douzable	September 1, 2017	Released
G	Andrew Gardner	September 1, 2017	Released
RB	Tim Hightower	September 1, 2017	Released
WR	Louis Murphy	September 1, 2017	Released
RB	Kapri Bibbs	September 1, 2017	Waived
OT	Andrew Lauderdale	September 1, 2017	Waived
WR	Tim Patrick	September 1, 2017	Waived
G	Norman Price	September 1, 2017	Waived
K	Nick Rose	September 1, 2017	Waived
ILB	Shayne Skov	September 1, 2017	Waived
S	Vinnie Sunseri	September 1, 2017	Waived
CB	Keith Reaser	September 16, 2017	Waived
LB	NaVorro Bowman	October 13, 2017	Released

== Draft ==
2017 San Francisco 49ers Draft
Round	Selection	Player	Position	College	Notes
1	2	Traded to the Bears^{[e]}			
1	3	Solomon Thomas	Defensive end	Stanford	From Bears^{[e]}
1	31	Reuben Foster	Linebacker	Alabama	From Seahawks^{[f]}
2	34	Traded to the Seahawks^{[f]}			
3	66	Ahkello Witherspoon	Cornerback	Colorado	
3	67	Traded to the Saints^{[g]}			From Bears^{[e]}
3	104	C. J. Beathard	Quarterback	Iowa	From Vikings^{[h]} Compensatory pick
4	109	Traded to the Vikings^{[h]}			
4	111	Traded to the Seahawks^{[f]}			From Bears^{[e]}
4	121	Joe Williams	Running back	Utah	From Colts^{[j]}
4	143	Traded to the Colts^{[j]}			Compensatory pick
5	146	George Kittle	Tight end	Iowa	
5	161	Traded to the Colts^{[j]}			From Redskins^{[d]}
5	177	Trent Taylor	Wide receiver	Louisiana Tech	From Broncos^{[i]} Compensatory pick
6	186	Traded to the Ravens^{[c]}			
6	198	D.J. Jones	Defensive tackle	Ole Miss	From Ravens^{[c]}
6	202	Pita Taumoepenu	Defensive end	Utah	From Broncos^{[a]}
7	219	Traded to the Vikings^{[h]}			From Browns^{[b]}
7	220	Traded to the Redskins^{[d]}			
7	229	Adrian Colbert	Cornerback	Miami (FL)	From Saints^{[g]}

Notes

^{^[a]} The 49ers acquired an additional sixth-round selection as part of a trade that sent their 2016 seventh-round selection and Vernon Davis to the Denver Broncos.
^{^[b]} The 49ers acquired an additional seventh-round selection as part of a trade that sent Andy Lee to the Cleveland Browns.
^{^[c]} The 49ers traded their sixth-round selection (Nos. 186 overall) to the Baltimore Ravens in exchange for their sixth-round selection (Nos. 198 overall) and C Jeremy Zuttah.
^{^[d]} The 49ers acquired an additional fifth-round selection as part of a trade that sent their Derek Carrier to the Washington Redskins in 2015, but sent a seventh-round selection back due to Carrier's performance.
^{^[e]} The 49ers traded their first-round selection (Nos. 2 overall) to the Chicago Bears in exchange for their third- and fourth-round selection (Nos. 67 and 111 overall) and 2018 third-round selections.
^{^[f]} The 49ers traded their second- and fourth-round selection (Nos. 34 and 111 overall) to the Seattle Seahawks in exchange for their first-round selection (Nos. 31 overall).
^{^[g]} The 49ers traded their third-round selection (Nos. 67 overall) to the New Orleans Saints in exchange for their seventh-round selection (Nos. 229 overall) and 2018 second-round selections.
^{^[h]} The 49ers traded their fourth- and seventh-round selection (Nos. 109 and 219 overall) to the Minnesota Vikings in exchange for their third-round selection (Nos. 104 overall).
^{^[i]} The 49ers traded their 2018 fourth-round selections to the Denver Broncos in exchange for their fifth-round selections (Nos. 177 overall) and RB Kapri Bibbs.
^{^[j]} The 49ers traded their fourth- and fifth-round selection (Nos. 143 and 161 overall) to the Indianapolis Colts in exchange for their fourth-round selection (Nos. 121 overall).

=== Undrafted free agents ===
Position	Player	College	Notes
WR	Victor Bolden	Oregon State	
WR	Kendrick Bourne	Eastern Washington	
RB	Matt Breida	Georgia Southern	
WR	K. D. Cannon	Baylor	Released May 8
OL	John Flynn	Montana State	
CB	Zach Franklin	Washburn	Waived August 8
DL	Jimmie Gilbert	Colorado	Waived with injury, July 31. Now on Injured Reserve
S	Malik Golden	Penn State	Waived June 9
OL	Evan Goodman	Arizona State	
TE	Cole Hikutini	Louisville	
DB	Lorenzo Jerome	Saint Francis (PA)	
OL	Erik Magnuson	Michigan	
FB	Tyler McCloskey	Houston	Waived September 1
QB	Nick Mullens	Southern Miss	
LB	Donavin Newsom	Missouri	Waived with injury, Aug 16. Now on Injured Reserve
DL	Noble Nwachukwu	West Virginia	
OL	Bret Treadway	Lamar	Released May 8
OL	Darrell Williams Jr.	Western Kentucky	
S	Chanceller James	Boise State	Waived August 14
WR	BJ Johnson III	Georgia Southern	Waived with injury, July 31. Now on Injured Reserve
OL	Richard Levy	UConn	Waived August 13

== Staff ==
2017 San Francisco 49ers staff
Front office: Co-Chairman – Denise DeBartolo York; Co-Chairman – John York; Chief Executive Officer – Jed York; Co-Owner – John M. Sobrato; Co-Owner – Mark Wan; Co-Owner – Gideon Yu; General Manager – John Lynch; President of 49ers Enterprises and EVP of Football Operations – Paraag Marathe; President – Al Guido; General Counsel – Hannah Gordon; Chief Investment Officer – Brano Perkovich; Chief Financial Officer – Scott Sabatino; Vice President of Player Personnel – Adam Peters; Senior Personnel Executive – Martin Mayhew; Vice President and Senior Advisor to the general manager – Keena Turner; Director of Pro Personnel – Ran Carthon; Director of Football Administration & Analytics – Brian Hampton; Head coaches: Head coach – Kyle Shanahan; Assistant head coach/tight ends – Jon Embree; Offensive coaches: Run game specialist – Mike McDaniel; Quarterbacks – Rich Scangarello; Running backs – Bobby Turner; Pass game specialist/wide receivers – Mike LaFleur; Offensive line – John Benton; Assistant offensive line – Adam Stenavich; Offensive assistant – T. C. McCartney; Offensive assistant – Katie Sowers; Offensive quality control – Taylor Embree	Defensive coaches: Defensive coordinator – Robert Saleh; Defensive line – Jeff Zgonina; Assistant defensive line – Vince Oghobaase; Linebackers – Johnny Holland; Defensive backs – Jeff Hafley; Assistant defensive backs – Daniel Bullocks; Senior defensive assistant – Jason Tarver; Defensive quality control – Tem Lukabu; Defensive quality control – DeMeco Ryans; Defensive quality control – Bobby Slowik; Special teams coaches: Special teams coordinator – Richard Hightower; Assistant special teams – Stan Kwan; Strength and conditioning: Head strength and conditioning – Ray Wright; Strength and conditioning assistant – Michael Clay; Strength and conditioning assistant – Marquis Johnson; Strength and conditioning assistant – Dustin Perry

== Final roster ==
2017 San Francisco 49ers roster
Quarterbacks (QB): 3 C. J. Beathard; 10 Jimmy Garoppolo; Running backs (RB): 28 Carlos Hyde; 22 Matt Breida; 44 Kyle Juszczyk FB; 33 Jeremy McNichols; Wide receivers (WR): 84 Kendrick Bourne; 11 Marquise Goodwin; 13 Max McCaffrey; 18 Louis Murphy; 19 Aldrick Robinson; 81 Trent Taylor; Tight ends (TE): 88 Garrett Celek; 85 George Kittle; 82 Logan Paulsen	Offensive linemen (OL): 61 Tim Barnes C; 68 Zane Beadles T/G; 63 Brandon Fusco G; 67 Daniel Kilgore C; 74 Joe Staley T; 75 Laken Tomlinson G; 78 Darrell Williams Jr. T; Defensive linemen (DL): 98 Ronald Blair DE; 99 DeForest Buckner DT; 95 Tank Carradine DE; 96 Sheldon Day DT; 58 Elvis Dumervil DE; 92 Leger Douzable DE; 93 D. J. Jones DT; 59 Aaron Lynch DE; 54 Cassius Marsh DE; 90 Earl Mitchell DT; 94 Solomon Thomas DE	Linebackers (LB): 50 Brock Coyle MLB; 56 Reuben Foster MLB; 57 Eli Harold OLB; 47 Elijah Lee OLB; 46 Mark Nzeocha OLB; 55 Pita Taumoepenu OLB; 97 Dekoda Watson OLB; Defensive backs (DB): 38 Adrian Colbert FS; 40 Antone Exum FS; 20 Leon Hall CB; 36 Dontae Johnson CB; 26 Greg Mabin CB; 27 Dexter McCoil SS; 45 Tyvis Powell SS; 35 Eric Reid SS; 24 K'Waun Williams CB; 23 Ahkello Witherspoon CB; Special teams (ST): 9 Robbie Gould K; 86 Kyle Nelson LS; 5 Bradley Pinion P	Practice squad: 14 DeAndre Carter WR; 60 JP Flynn C (IR); 69 Cameron Hunt G; 64 Andrew Lauderdale T; 49 Boseko Lokombo MLB; 4 Nick Mullens QB; 71 Pace Murphy T; 46 Trovon Reed CB; 1 DeAndre Smelter WR; 41 Channing Stribling CB; 89 Cole Wick TE; Reserve: 91 Arik Armstead DE (IR); 17 Victor Bolden Jr. WR (IR); 77 Trent Brown T (IR); 13 Aaron Burbridge WR (IR); 15 Pierre Garçon WR (IR); 65 Joshua Garnett G (IR); 47 Jimmie Gilbert OLB (IR); 76 Garry Gilliam T (IR); 83 Cole Hikutini TE (IR); 30 Asa Jackson CB (IR); 43 Chanceller James SS (IR); 92 Chris Jones DT (IR); -- Don Jones SS (IR); 62 Erik Magnuson T (IR); 31 Raheem Mostert RB (IR); 48 Donavin Newsom MLB (IR); 51 Malcolm Smith OLB (IR); 29 Jaquiski Tartt FS (IR); 25 Jimmie Ward FS (IR); 32 Joe Williams RB (IR); Rookies in italics 53 active, 21 reserve, 10 practice squad

== Preseason ==
Week	Date	Opponent	Result	Record	Venue	Recap
1	August 11	at Kansas City Chiefs	W 27–17	1–0	Arrowhead Stadium	Recap
2	August 19	Denver Broncos	L 14–33	1–1	Levi's Stadium	Recap
3	August 27	at Minnesota Vikings	L 31–32	1–2	U.S. Bank Stadium	Recap
4	August 31	Los Angeles Chargers	W 23–13	2–2	Levi's Stadium	Recap

== Regular season ==
=== Schedule ===
Week	Date	Opponent	Result	Record	Venue	Recap
1	September 10	Carolina Panthers	**L** 3–23	0–1	Levi's Stadium	Recap
2	September 17	at **Seattle Seahawks**	**L** 9–12	0–2	CenturyLink Field	Recap
3	September 21	**Los Angeles Rams**	**L** 39–41	0–3	Levi's Stadium	Recap
4	October 1	at **Arizona Cardinals**	**L** 15–18 (OT)	0–4	University of Phoenix Stadium	Recap
5	October 8	at Indianapolis Colts	**L** 23–26 (OT)	0–5	Lucas Oil Stadium	Recap
6	October 15	at Washington Redskins	**L** 24–26	0–6	FedExField	Recap
7	October 22	Dallas Cowboys	**L** 10–40	0–7	Levi's Stadium	Recap
8	October 29	at Philadelphia Eagles	**L** 10–33	0–8	Lincoln Financial Field	Recap
9	November 5	**Arizona Cardinals**	**L** 10–20	0–9	Levi's Stadium	Recap
10	November 12	New York Giants	**W** 31–21	1–9	Levi's Stadium	Recap
11	Bye					
12	November 26	**Seattle Seahawks**	**L** 13–24	1–10	Levi's Stadium	Recap
13	December 3	at Chicago Bears	**W** 15–14	2–10	Soldier Field	Recap
14	December 10	at Houston Texans	**W** 26–16	3–10	NRG Stadium	Recap
15	December 17	Tennessee Titans	**W** 25–23	4–10	Levi's Stadium	Recap
16	December 24	Jacksonville Jaguars	**W** 44–33	5–10	Levi's Stadium	Recap
17	December 31	at **Los Angeles Rams**	**W** 34–13	6–10	Los Angeles Memorial Coliseum	Recap
Note: Intra-division opponents are in **bold** text.

=== Game summaries ===
==== Week 1: vs. Carolina Panthers ====
Week One: Carolina Panthers at San Francisco 49ers – Game summary

Quarter	1	2	3	4	Total
**Panthers**	7	6	10	0	**23**
49ers	0	0	3	0	**3**

at Levi's Stadium, Santa Clara, California

- Date: September 10
- Game time: 1:25 p.m. PDT
- Game weather: 87 °F (31 °C), clear
- Game attendance: 70,178
- Referee: Clete Blakeman
- TV announcers (Fox): Thom Brennaman, Chris Spielman and Peter Schrager
- Recap, Gamebook

Game information

**First quarter**

- CAR – Russell Shepard 40-yard pass from Cam Newton (Graham Gano kick), 3:10. Panthers 7–0. **Drive: 3 plays, 42 yards, 1:35.**

**Second quarter**

- CAR – Graham Gano 39-yard field goal, 3:28. Panthers 10–0. **Drive: 8 plays, 27 yards, 3:04.**
- CAR – Graham Gano 36-yard field goal, 0:05. Panthers 13–0. **Drive: 7 plays, 37 yards, 0:42.**

**Third quarter**

- CAR – Jonathan Stewart 9-yard pass from Cam Newton (Graham Gano kick), 11:32. Panthers 20–0. **Drive: 5 plays, 28 yards, 3:01.**
- CAR – Graham Gano 20-yard field goal, 3:14. Panthers 23–0. **Drive: 11 plays, 40 yards, 6:53.**
- SF – Robbie Gould 44-yard field goal, 0:13. Panthers 23–3. **Drive: 10 plays, 49 yards, 3:03.**

**Fourth quarter**

- No scoring plays.

**Top passers**

- CAR – Cam Newton – 14/25, 171 yards, 2 TD, INT
- SF – Brian Hoyer – 24/35, 193 yards, INT

**Top rushers**

- CAR – Jonathan Stewart – 18 rushes, 65 yards
- SF – Carlos Hyde – 9 rushes, 45 yards

**Top receivers**

- CAR – Russell Shepard – 2 receptions, 53 yards, TD
- SF – Pierre Garcon – 6 receptions, 81 yards

**Top tacklers**

- CAR –
- SF –

With this loss, The 49ers started off the Shanahan era 0–1

==== Week 2: at Seattle Seahawks ====
Week Two: San Francisco 49ers at Seattle Seahawks – Game summary

Quarter	1	2	3	4	Total
49ers	0	6	0	3	**9**
**Seahawks**	6	0	0	6	**12**

at CenturyLink Field, Seattle, Washington

- Date: September 17
- Game time: 1:25 pm. PDT
- Game weather: 65 °F (18 °C), mostly cloudy
- Game attendance: 68,729
- Referee: Bill Vinovich
- TV announcers (Fox): Sam Rosen, David Diehl and Jennifer Hale
- Recap, Gamebook

Game information

**First quarter**

- SEA – Blair Walsh 25-yard field goal, 8:38. Seahawks 3–0. **Drive: 16 plays, 68 yards, 6:22.**
- SEA – Blair Walsh 27-yard field goal, 0:49. Seahawks 6–0. **Drive: 10 plays, 27 yards, 4:42.**

**Second quarter**

- SF – Robbie Gould 40-yard field goal, 1:55. Seahawks 6–3. **Drive: 6 plays, 67 yards, 2:37.**
- SF – Robbie Gould 37-yard field goal, 0:17. Tied 6–6. **Drive: 7 plays, 49 yards, 0:39.**

**Third quarter**

- No scoring plays.

**Fourth quarter**

- SF – Robbie Gould 34-yard field goal, 11:36. 49ers 9–6. **Drive: 10 plays, 54 yards, 3:58.**
- SEA – Paul Richardson 9-yard pass from Russell Wilson (kick failed, hit right upright), 7:06. Seahawks 12–9. **Drive: 10 plays, 82 yards, 4:30.**

**Top passers**

- SF – Brian Hoyer – 15/27, 99 yards, INT
- SEA – Russell Wilson – 23/39, 198 yards, TD

**Top rushers**

- SF – Carlos Hyde – 15 rushes, 124 yards
- SEA – Chris Carson – 20 rushes, 93 yards

**Top receivers**

- SF – Marquise Goodwin – 3 receptions, 26 yards
- SEA – Tyler Lockett – 6 receptions, 64 yards

**Top tacklers**

- SF – NaVorro Bowman – 7 solo tackles, 4 assisted
- SEA – K. J. Wright – 5 solo tackles, 3 assisted

With this loss, the 49ers fell to 0–2

==== Week 3: vs. Los Angeles Rams ====
Week Three: Los Angeles Rams at San Francisco 49ers – Game summary

Quarter	1	2	3	4	Total
**Rams**	14	10	10	7	**41**
49ers	7	6	7	19	**39**

at Levi's Stadium, Santa Clara, California

- Date: September 21
- Game time: 5:25 pm. PDT
- Game weather: 68 °F (20 °C), mostly sunny
- Game attendance: 70,178
- Referee: Jeff Triplette
- TV announcers (NFLN): Mike Tirico, Cris Collinsworth and Heather Cox
- Recap, Gamebook

Game information

**First quarter**

- LAR – Todd Gurley 3-yard run (Greg Zuerlein kick), 14:48. Rams 7–0. **Drive: 1 play, 3 yards, 0:04.**
- SF – Brian Hoyer 2-yard run (Robbie Gould kick), 8:17. Tied 7–7. **Drive: 14 plays, 81 yards, 6:31.**
- LAR – Todd Gurley 7-yard pass from Jared Goff (Greg Zuerlein kick), 4:32. Rams 14–7. **Drive: 8 plays, 75 yards, 3:45.**

**Second quarter**

- LAR – Greg Zuerlein 48-yard field goal, 14:55. Rams 17–7. **Drive: 7 plays, 38 yards, 3:10.**
- SF – Robbie Gould 36-yard field goal, 9:37. Rams 17–10. **Drive: 4 plays, -6 yards, 1:58.**
- SF – Robbie Gould 48-yard field goal, 3:46. Rams 17–13. **Drive: 8 plays, 47 yards, 4:44.**
- LAR – Todd Gurley 2-yard run (Greg Zuerlein kick), 0:49. Rams 24–13. **Drive: 9 plays, 75 yards, 2:57.**

**Third quarter**

- LAR – Greg Zuerlein 19-yard field goal, 9:17. Rams 27–13. **Drive: 10 plays, 74 yards, 5:43.**
- SF – Carlos Hyde 3-yard run (Robbie Gould kick), 5:40. Rams 27–20. **Drive: 10 plays, 75 yards, 3:37.**
- LAR – Sammy Watkins 1-yard pass from Jared Goff (Greg Zuerlein kick), 0:17. Rams 34–20. **Drive: 10 plays, 75 yards, 5:23.**

**Fourth quarter**

- SF – Garrett Celek 1-yard pass from Brian Hoyer (kick failed), 12:50. Rams 34–26. **Drive: 6 plays, 75 yards, 2:27.**
- LAR – Sammy Watkins 12-yard pass from Jared Goff (Greg Zuerlein kick), 8:43. Rams 41–26. **Drive: 7 plays, 75 yards, 4:07.**
- SF – Trent Taylor 1-yard pass from Brian Hoyer (Robbie Gould kick), 5:08. Rams 41–33. **Drive: 4 plays, 64 yards, 1:27.**
- SF – Carlos Hyde 1-yard run (pass failed), 2:13. Rams 41–39. **Drive: 8 plays, 29 yards, 2:48.**

**Top passers**

- SF – Brian Hoyer – 23/37, 332 yards, 2 TD, INT
- LAR – Jared Goff – 22/28, 288 yards, 3 TD

**Top rushers**

- SF – Carlos Hyde – 25 rushes, 84 yards, 2 TD
- LAR – Todd Gurley – 28 rushes, 113 yards, 2 TD

**Top receivers**

- SF – Pierre Garcon – 7 receptions, 142 yards
- LAR – Robert Woods – 6 receptions, 108 yards

**Top tacklers**

- SF – Jimmie Ward – 7 solo tackles
- LAR – Alec Ogletree – 7 solo tackles, 2 assisted

After losing to the Seahawks on the road, the 49ers went home to take on the Rams on Thursday Night Football. In the first quarter, the Rams scored first when Todd Gurley ran for a 3-yard touchdown to make it 7–0. The Niners managed to tie it up when Brian Hoyer ran for a 9-yard touchdown to make it 7–7. The Rams moved back into the lead when Jared Goff found Gurley on a 7-yard pass to make it 14–7. In the second quarter, the Rams increased their lead when Greg Zuerlein kicked a 48-yard field goal to make it 17–7. The Niners came within 4 with two field goals of their own kicked by Robbie Gould from 36 and 48 yards out to make the score 17-10 and then 17–13. Gurley then put the Rams up by double digits at halftime when he ran for a 2-yard touchdown to make it 24–13. In the third quarter Zuerlein kicked a 19-yard field goal to make it 27–13 Rams. The Niners then came within a touchdown when Carlos Hyde ran for one from a yard out. The Rams moved up by 2 touchdowns again when Goff found Sammy Watkins on a 1-yard pass to make it 34–20. In the fourth quarter, the Niners came within 8 when Garrett Celek caught a 1-yard pass from Hoyer (with a failed PAT) to make it 34–26. The Rams again moved up by double digits when Goff and Watkins connected again on a 13-yard pass to make it 41–26. Finally, the Niners were able to come within two points with two more touchdowns: Trent Taylor caught a pass from Hoyer 3 yards out to make it 41–33 and Hyde ran for another 1-yard touchdown (with a failed two-point conversion) to make the final score 41–39.

With the loss, the Niners fell to 0–3.

==== Week 4: at Arizona Cardinals ====
Week Four: San Francisco 49ers at Arizona Cardinals – Game summary

Quarter	1	2	3	4	OT	Total
49ers	3	3	6	0	3	**15**
**Cardinals**	0	6	3	3	6	**18**

at University of Phoenix Stadium, Glendale, Arizona

- Date: October 1
- Game time: 1:05 p.m. MST & PDT
- Game weather: Played indoors (retractable roof closed)
- Game attendance: 64,121
- Referee: Tony Corrente
- TV announcers (Fox): Sam Rosen, David Diehl and Jennifer Hale
- Recap, Gamebook

Game information

**First quarter**

- SF – Robbie Gould 49-yard field goal, 2:05. 49ers 3–0. **Drive: 10 plays, 45 yards, 3:45.**

**Second quarter**

- ARI – Phil Dawson 29-yard field goal, 13:07. Tied 3–3. **Drive: 9 plays, 63 yards, 3:58.**
- SF – Robbie Gould 39-yard field goal, 7:16. 49ers 6–3. **Drive: 12 plays, 64 yards, 5:51.**
- ARI – Phil Dawson 43-yard field goal, 1:24. Tied 6–6. **Drive: 4 plays, 5 yards, 0:30.**

**Third quarter**

- SF – Robbie Gould 47-yard field goal, 10:34. 49ers 9–6. **Drive: 9 plays, 46 yards, 4:26.**
- ARI – Phil Dawson 50-yard field goal, 6:50. Tied 9–9. **Drive: 7 plays, 43 yards, 3:44.**
- SF – Robbie Gould 48-yard field goal, 2:22. 49ers 12–9. **Drive: 11 plays, 45 yards, 4:28.**

**Fourth quarter**

- ARI – Phil Dawson 32-yard field goal, 7:41. Tied 12–12. **Drive: 11 plays, 50 yards, 6:08.**

**Overtime**

- SF – Robbie Gould 23-yard field goal, 2:24. 49ers 15–12. **Drive: 17 plays, 73 yards, 7:36.**
- ARI – Larry Fitzgerald 19-yard pass from Carson Palmer, 0:32. Cardinals 18–15. **Drive: 7 plays, 75 yards, 1:52.**

**Top passers**

- SF – Brian Hoyer – 24/49, 234 yards, INT
- ARI – Carson Palmer – 33/51, 357 yards, TD, INT

**Top rushers**

- SF – Carlos Hyde – 16 carries, 68 yards
- ARI – Chris Johnson – 13 carries, 32 yards

**Top receivers**

- SF – Trent Taylor – 5 receptions, 47 yards
- ARI – Andre Ellington – 9 receptions, 86 yards

**Top tacklers**

- SF –
- ARI –

With this loss, the 49ers fell to 0–4, as well as being 0–3 in the NFC West Division

==== Week 5: at Indianapolis Colts ====
Week Five: San Francisco 49ers at Indianapolis Colts – Game summary

Quarter	1	2	3	4	OT	Total
49ers	3	3	0	17	0	**23**
**Colts**	3	3	10	7	3	**26**

at Lucas Oil Stadium, Indianapolis, Indiana

- Date: October 8
- Game time: 1:00 p.m. EDT/10:00 am. PDT
- Game weather: Played indoors (retractable roof closed)
- Game attendance: 65,612
- Referee: Walt Coleman
- TV announcers (Fox): Thom Brennaman, Chris Spielman and Peter Schrager
- Recap, Gamebook

Game information

**First quarter**

- IND – Adam Vinatieri 52-yard field goal, 9:09. Colts 3–0. **Drive: 11 plays, 41 yards, 5:51.**
- SF – Robbie Gould 28-yard field goal, 2:37. Tied 3–3. **Drive: 12 plays, 65 yards, 6:32.**

**Second quarter**

- IND – Adam Vinatieri 23-yard field goal, 0:59. Colts 6–3. **Drive: 11 plays, 72 yards, 3:57.**
- SF – Robbie Gould 43-yard field goal, 0:02. Tied 6–6. **Drive: 6 plays, 50 yards, 0:57.**

**Third quarter**

- IND – Adam Vinatieri 38-yard field goal, 7:42. Colts 9–6. **Drive: 10 plays, 30 yards, 5:21.**
- IND – Marlon Mack 22-yard run (Adam Vinatieri kick), 3:17. Colts 16–6. **Drive: 4 plays, 60 yards, 2:33.**

**Fourth quarter**

- SF – Robbie Gould 40-yard field goal, 13:39. Colts 16–9. **Drive: 12 plays, 69 yards, 4:38.**
- IND – Jacoby Brissett 3-yard run (Adam Vinatieri kick), 9:56. Colts 23–9. **Drive: 6 plays, 75 yards, 3:43.**
- SF – Kyle Juszczyk 6-yard pass from Brian Hoyer (Robbie Gould kick), 8:00. Colts 23–16. **Drive: 5 plays, 79 yards, 1:56.**
- SF – George Kittle 5-yard pass from Brian Hoyer (Robbie Gould kick), 0:20. Tied 23–23. **Drive: 14 plays, 89 yards, 5:09.**

**Overtime**

- IND – Adam Vinatieri 51-yard field goal, 1:38. Colts 26–23. **Drive: 8 plays, 49 yards, 2:01.**

**Top passers**

- SF – Brian Hoyer – 29/46, 353 yards, 2 TD
- IND – Jacoby Brissett – 22/34, 314 yards, INT

**Top rushers**

- SF – Matt Breida – 10 carries, 49 yards
- IND – Marlon Mack – 9 carries, 91 yards, TD

**Top receivers**

- SF – Pierre Garçon – 8 receptions, 94 yards
- IND – T. Y. Hilton – 7 receptions, 177 yards

**Top tacklers**

- SF –
- IND –

With this loss, the 49ers fell to 0–5

==== Week 6: at Washington Redskins ====
Week Six: San Francisco 49ers at Washington Redskins – Game summary

Quarter	1	2	3	4	Total
49ers	0	7	10	7	**24**
**Redskins**	7	10	0	9	**26**

at FedExField, Landover, Maryland

- Date: October 15
- Game time: 1:00 pm. EDT/10:00 am. PDT
- Game weather: 68 °F (20 °C), cloudy
- Game attendance: 75,568
- Referee: John Parry
- TV announcers (Fox): Chris Myers, Daryl Johnston and Laura Okmin
- Recap, Gamebook

Game information

**First quarter**

- WAS – Josh Doctson 11-yard pass from Kirk Cousins (Dustin Hopkins kick), 10:14. Redskins 7–0. **Drive: 8 plays, 75 yards, 4:46.**

**Second quarter**

- WAS – Samaje Perine 3-yard pass from Kirk Cousins (Dustin Hopkins kick), 9:47. Redskins 14–0. **Drive: 10 plays, 64 yards, 5:46.**
- WAS – Dustin Hopkins 48-yard field goal, 1:51. Redskins 17–0. **Drive: 8 plays, 55 yards, 3:24.**
- SF – Carlos Hyde 1-yard run (Robbie Gould kick), 0:00. Redskins 17–7. **Drive: 11 plays, 75 yards, 1:51.**

**Third quarter**

- SF – Robbie Gould 52-yard field goal, 9:41. Redskins 17–10. **Drive: 12 plays, 42 yards, 5:19.**
- SF – Carlos Hyde 1-yard run (Robbie Gould kick), 3:01. Tied 17–17. **Drive: 1 plays, 1 yards, 0:05.**

**Fourth quarter**

- WAS – Dustin Hopkins 21-yard field goal, 10:34. Redskins 20–17. **Drive: 16 plays, 72 yards, 7:27.**
- WAS – Kirk Cousins 7-yard run (kick failed), 3:28. Redskins 26–17. **Drive: 9 plays, 84 yards, 4:54.**
- SF – Aldrick Robinson 45-yard pass from C. J. Beathard (Robbie Gould kick), 1:58. Redskins 26–24. **Drive: 6 plays, 75 yards, 1:30.**

**Top passers**

- SF – C. J. Beathard – 19/36, 245 yards, TD, INT
- WAS – Kirk Cousins – 25/37, 330 yards, 2 TD, INT

**Top rushers**

- SF – Carlos Hyde – 13 carries, 28 yards, 2 TD
- WAS – Chris Thompson – 16 carries, 33 yards

**Top receivers**

- SF – Pierre Garçon – 5 receptions, 55 yards
- WAS – Chris Thompson – 4 receptions, 105 yards

**Top tacklers**

- SF –
- WAS –

With the loss, the 49ers fell to 0–6. With the Giants defeating the Broncos on Sunday Night Football, they became the last winless team in the NFC.

==== Week 7: vs. Dallas Cowboys ====
Week Seven: Dallas Cowboys at San Francisco 49ers – Game summary

Quarter	1	2	3	4	Total
**Cowboys**	14	6	13	7	**40**
49ers	3	0	0	7	**10**

at Levi's Stadium, Santa Clara, California

- Date: October 22
- Game time: 1:05 pm. PDT
- Game weather: 68 °F (20 °C), sunny
- Game attendance: 70,133
- Referee: Ronald Torbert
- TV announcers (Fox): Thom Brennaman, Troy Aikman and Erin Andrews
- Recap, Gamebook

Game information

**First quarter**

- DAL - Ezekiel Elliott 1-yard run (Dan Bailey kick), 12:46. Cowboys 7–0. **Drive: 3 plays, 20 yards, 1:18.**
- DAL - Ezekiel Elliott 25-yard run (Dan Bailey kick), 7:57. Cowboys 14–0. **Drive: 7 plays, 74 yards, 3:28.**
- SF - Robbie Gould 42-yard field goal, 4:33. Cowboys 14–3. **Drive: 9 plays, 53 yards, 3:28.**

**Second quarter**

- DAL - Jason Witten 18-yard pass from Dak Prescott (pass failed), 10:33. Cowboys 20–3. **Drive: 12 plays, 86 yards, 5:03.**

**Third quarter**

- DAL - Ezekiel Elliott 72-yard pass from Dak Prescott (Jeff Heath kick), 11:12. Cowboys 27–3. **Drive: 1 play, 72 yards, 0:14.**
- DAL - Dak Prescott 2-yard run (kick failed), 0:46. Cowboys 33–3. **Drive: 13 plays, 80 yards, 7:44.**

**Fourth quarter**

- DAL - Dez Bryant 2-yard pass from Dak Prescott (Jeff Heath kick), 10:54. Cowboys 40–3. **Drive: 8 plays, 29 yards, 4:11.**
- SF - C. J. Beathard 4-yard run (Robbie Gould kick), 6:19. Cowboys 40–10. **Drive: 12 plays, 75 yards, 4:35.**

**Top passers**

- DAL – Dak Prescott – 16/25, 234 yards, 3 TD
- SF – C. J. Beathard – 22/38, 235 yards

**Top rushers**

- DAL – Ezekiel Elliott – 26 rushes, 147 yards, 2 TD
- SF – Carlos Hyde – 14 rushes, 68 yards

**Top receivers**

- DAL – Ezekiel Elliott – 1 reception, 72 yards, TD
- SF – Marquise Goodwin – 4 receptions, 80 yards

**Top tacklers**

- DAL – Anthony Hitchens – 8 tackles
- SF – Dontae Johnson – 6 tackles

With this loss, the 49ers fell to 0–7

==== Week 8: at Philadelphia Eagles ====
Week Eight: San Francisco 49ers at Philadelphia Eagles – Game summary

Quarter	1	2	3	4	Total
49ers	0	0	7	3	**10**
**Eagles**	3	14	10	6	**33**

at Lincoln Financial Field, Philadelphia, Pennsylvania

- Date: October 29
- Game time: 1:00 pm. EDT/10:00 am. PDT
- Game weather: 67 °F (19 °C), rain
- Game attendance: 69,596
- Referee: Clete Blakeman
- TV announcers (Fox): Kenny Albert, Charles Davis and Pam Oliver
- Recap, Gamebook

Game information

**First quarter**

- PHI – Jake Elliott 40-yard field goal, 2:35. Eagles 3–0. **Drive: 11 plays, 47 yards, 5:50.**

**Second quarter**

- PHI – Zach Ertz 1-yard pass from Carson Wentz (kick failed), 1:51. Eagles 10–0. **Drive: 6 plays, 32 yards, 2:51.**
- PHI – Jalen Mills 37-yard interception return (Alshon Jeffery pass from Carson Wentz), 1:24. Eagles 17–0. **Drive: 0 plays, 37 yards, 0:00.**

**Third quarter**

- PHI – Jake Elliott 51-yard field goal, 8:01. Eagles 20–0. **Drive: 6 plays, 19 yards, 1:25.**
- SF – Matt Breida 21-yard pass from C. J. Beathard (Robbie Gould kick), 4:29. Eagles 20–7. **Drive: 2 plays, 21 yards, 0:14.**
- PHI – Alshon Jeffery 53-yard pass from Carson Wentz (Jake Elliott kick), 3:37. Eagles 27–7. **Drive: 3 plays, 75 yards, 0:52.**

**Fourth quarter**

- PHI – LeGarrette Blount 12-yard run (kick failed), 10:22. Eagles 33–7. **Drive: 8 plays, 47 yards, 3:38.**
- SF – Robbie Gould 50-yard field goal, 5:20. Eagles 33–10. **Drive: 11 plays, 33 yards, 5:02.**

**Top passers**

- SF – C. J. Beathard – 17/36, 167 yards, TD, 2 INT
- PHI – Carson Wentz – 18/32, 211 yards, 2 TD, INT

**Top rushers**

- SF – C. J. Beathard – 6 rushes, 40 yards
- PHI – Corey Clement – 10 rushes, 54 yards

**Top receivers**

- SF – Matt Breida – 4 receptions, 39 yards, TD
- PHI – Alshon Jeffery – 2 receptions, 62 yards, TD

With this loss, the 49ers secured their fourth consecutive non-winning season.

==== Week 9: vs. Arizona Cardinals ====
Week Nine: Arizona Cardinals at San Francisco 49ers – Game summary

Quarter	1	2	3	4	Total
**Cardinals**	7	7	0	6	**20**
49ers	0	3	7	0	**10**

at Levi's Stadium, Santa Clara, California

- Date: November 5
- Game time: 1:05 pm. PST
- Game weather: 61 °F (16 °C), sunny
- Game attendance: 70,133
- Referee: Craig Wrolstad
- TV announcers (Fox): Chris Myers, Daryl Johnston and Laura Okmin
- Recap, Gamebook

Game information

**First quarter**

- ARI – Jaron Brown 3-yard pass from Drew Stanton (Phil Dawson kick), 10:15. Cardinals 7–0. **Drive: 3 plays, 6 yards, 1:23.**

**Second quarter**

- SF – Robbie Gould 42-yard field goal, 14:55. Cardinals 7–3. **Drive: 6 plays, 58 yards, 1:43.**
- ARI – Jermaine Gresham 11-yard pass from Drew Stanton (Phil Dawson kick), 11:04. Cardinals 14–3. **Drive: 7 plays, 75 yards, 3:51.**

**Third quarter**

- SF – C. J. Beathard 1-yard run (Robbie Gould kick), 9:43. Cardinals 14–10. **Drive: 13 plays, 75 yards, 5:17.**

**Fourth quarter**

- ARI – Phil Dawson 25-yard field goal, 13:31. Cardinals 17–10. **Drive: 12 plays, 65 yards, 6:24.**
- ARI – Phil Dawson 32-yard field goal, 5:33. Cardinals 20–10. **Drive: 11 plays, 39 yards, 7:02.**

**Top passers**

- ARI – Drew Stanton – 15/30, 201 yards, 2 TD, INT
- SF – C. J. Beathard – 24/51, 294 yards, INT

**Top rushers**

- ARI – Adrian Peterson – 37 carries, 159 yards
- SF – Carlos Hyde – 12 carries, 41 yards

**Top receivers**

- ARI – Larry Fitzgerald – 5 receptions, 70 yards
- SF – Carlos Hyde – 9 receptions, 84 yards

**Top tacklers**

- ARI –
- SF –

With this loss, the 49ers fell to 0–9, securing their 3rd consecutive losing season

==== Week 10: vs. New York Giants ====
Week Ten: New York Giants at San Francisco 49ers – Game summary

Quarter	1	2	3	4	Total
Giants	6	7	0	8	**21**
**49ers**	3	14	0	14	**31**

at Levi's Stadium, Santa Clara, California

- Date: November 12
- Game time: 1:25 pm. PST
- Game weather: 68 °F (20 °C), sunny
- Game attendance: 70,133
- Referee: Jerome Boger
- TV announcers (Fox): Chris Myers, Daryl Johnston and Laura Okmin
- Recap, Gamebook

Game information

**First quarter**

- SF – Robbie Gould 43-yard field goal, 12:44. 49ers 3–0. **Drive: 5 plays, 35 yards, 2:20.**
- NYG – Aldrick Rosas 47-yard field goal, 7:28. Tied 3–3. **Drive: 10 plays, 46 yards, 5:17.**
- NYG – Aldrick Rosas 42-yard field goal, 1:11. Giants 6–3. **Drive: 6 plays, 40 yards, 2:27.**

**Second quarter**

- SF – Marquise Goodwin 83-yard pass from C. J. Beathard (Robbie Gould kick), 8:10. 49ers 10–6. **Drive: 3 plays, 85 yards, 2:01.**
- NYG – Evan Engram 9-yard pass from Eli Manning (Aldrick Rosas kick), 2:13. Giants 13–10. **Drive: 10 plays, 75 yards, 5:51.**
- SF – Garrett Celek 47-yard pass from C. J. Beathard (Robbie Gould kick), 0:37. 49ers 17–13. **Drive: 6 plays, 76 yards, 1:40.**

**Third quarter**

- No scoring plays.

**Fourth quarter**

- SF – C. J. Beathard 11-yard run (Robbie Gould kick), 15:00. 49ers 24–13. **Drive: 11 plays, 61 yards, 5:46.**
- SF – Matt Breida 33-yard run (Robbie Gould kick), 9:27. 49ers 31–13. **Drive: 6 plays, 62 yards, 3:32.**
- NYG – Roger Lewis 14-yard pass from Eli Manning (Orleans Darkwa run), 1:07. 49ers 31–21. **Drive: 15 plays, 90 yards, 4:34.**

**Top passers**

- NYG – Eli Manning – 28/37, 273 yards, 2 TD
- SF – C. J. Beathard – 19/25, 288 yards, 2 TD, INT

**Top rushers**

- NYG – Orleans Darkwa – 14 rushes, 70 yards
- SF – Carlos Hyde – 17 rushes, 98 yards

**Top receivers**

- NYG – Sterling Shepard – 11 receptions, 142 yards
- SF – Marquise Goodwin – 1 reception, 83 yards, TD

**Top tacklers**

- NYG –
- SF –

After starting the season 0–9, which was never recorded in team history, the Niners left the Cleveland Browns the only winless team in the NFL for 2017. This game also ended the possibility of the Niners becoming the second NFL team to go 0–16. This was also Kyle Shanahan’s first win as a head coach.

==== Week 12: vs. Seattle Seahawks ====
Week Twelve: Seattle Seahawks at San Francisco 49ers – Game summary

Quarter	1	2	3	4	Total
**Seahawks**	0	7	7	10	**24**
49ers	0	3	3	7	**13**

at Levi's Stadium, Santa Clara, California

- Date: November 26
- Game time: 1:05 pm. PST
- Game weather: 66 °F (19 °C), cloudy
- Game attendance: 70,134
- Referee: Pete Morelli
- TV announcers (Fox): Kenny Albert, Ronde Barber and Kristina Pink
- Recap, Gamebook

Game information

**First quarter**

- No scoring plays.

**Second quarter**

- SEA – Russell Wilson 2-yard run (Blair Walsh kick), 13:28. Seahawks 7–0. **Drive: 2 plays, 16 yards, 0:38.**
- SF – Robbie Gould 38-yard field goal, 0:08. Seahawks 7–3. **Drive: 7 plays, 47 yards, 1:35.**

**Third quarter**

- SF – Robbie Gould 42-yard field goal, 9:24. Seahawks 7–6. **Drive: 10 plays, 51 yards, 5:41.**
- SEA – Nick Vannett 17-yard pass from Russell Wilson (Blair Walsh kick), 6:37. Seahawks 14–6. **Drive: 6 plays, 71 yards, 2:46.**

**Fourth quarter**

- SEA – Jimmy Graham 1-yard pass from Russell Wilson (Blair Walsh kick), 15:00. Seahawks 21–6. **Drive: 11 plays, 63 yards, 5:37.**
- SEA – Blair Walsh 34-yard field goal, 3:30. Seahawks 24–6. **Drive: 6 plays, 29 yards, 1:42.**
- SF – Louis Murphy 10-yard pass from Jimmy Garoppolo (Robbie Gould kick), 0:02. Seahawks 24–13. **Drive: 13 plays, 75 yards, 3:27.**

**Top passers**

- SEA – Russell Wilson – 20/34, 228 yards, 2 TD, INT
- SF – C. J. Beathard – 22/38, 201 yards, INT

**Top rushers**

- SEA – Eddie Lacy – 17 rushes, 46 yards
- SF – Carlos Hyde – 16 rushes, 47 yards

**Top receivers**

- SEA – Paul Richardson – 4 receptions, 70 yards
- SF – Marquise Goodwin – 4 receptions, 78 yards

**Top tacklers**

- SEA –
- SF –

This game saw Jimmy Garoppolo's first play that resulted in a Touchdown pass to Louis Murphy Jr. The game also fall to 1–10 and 0–5 in the NFC West and resulted in their third straight season missing the playoffs and their 9th straight loss to Seattle since the 2013 NFC Championship.

==== Week 13: at Chicago Bears ====
Week Thirteen: San Francisco 49ers at Chicago Bears – Game summary

Quarter	1	2	3	4	Total
**49ers**	3	6	3	3	**15**
Bears	7	7	0	0	**14**

at Soldier Field, Chicago, Illinois

- Date: December 3
- Game time: 12:00 p.m. CST/10:00 am. PST
- Game weather: 54 °F (12 °C), sunny
- Game attendance: 61,302
- Referee: Ed Hochuli
- TV announcers (CBS): Andrew Catalon and James Lofton
- Recap, Gamebook

Game information

**First quarter**

- SF – Robbie Gould 33-yard field goal, 8:16. 49ers 3–0. **Drive: 14 plays, 60 yards, 6:48**
- CHI – Dontrelle Inman 8-yard pass from Mitchell Trubisky (Cairo Santos kick), 0:16. Bears 7–3. **Drive: 7 plays, 59 yards, 4:31**

**Second quarter**

- SF – Robbie Gould 28-yard field goal, 12:01. Bears 7–6. **Drive: 7 plays, 64 yards, 3:13.**
- CHI – Tarik Cohen 61-yard punt return (Cairo Santos kick), 6:12. Bears 14–6.
- SF – Robbie Gould 35-yard field goal, 0:29. Bears 14–9. **Drive: 11 plays, 58 yards, 5:25.**

**Third quarter**

- SF – Robbie Gould 34-yard field goal, 2:00. Bears 14–12. **Drive: 16 plays, 70 yards, 8:19.**

**Fourth quarter**

- SF – Robbie Gould 24-yard field goal, 0:08. 49ers 15–14. **Drive: 14 plays, 86 yards, 5:23.**

**Top passers**

- SF – Jimmy Garoppolo - 26/37, 293 yards, INT
- CHI – Mitchell Trubisky - 12/15, 102 yards, TD

**Top rushers**

- SF – Carlos Hyde - 17 carries, 54 yards
- CHI – Jordan Howard - 13 carries, 38 yards

**Top receivers**

- SF – Marquise Goodwin - 8 receptions, 99 yards
- CHI – Tarik Cohen - 4 receptions, 39 yards

**Top tacklers**

- SF – Reuben Foster - 7 tackles
- CHI – Christian Jones and Danny Trevathan - 10 tackles

This was Jimmy Garoppolo's first start as a 49ers quarterback. Garoppolo lead them to their 2nd win of the season as they were now 2–10

==== Week 14: at Houston Texans ====
Week Fourteen: San Francisco 49ers at Houston Texans – Game summary

Quarter	1	2	3	4	Total
**49ers**	0	13	10	3	**26**
Texans	3	6	7	0	**16**

at NRG Stadium, Houston, Texas

- Date: December 10
- Game time: 12:00 pm. CST/10:00 am. PST
- Game weather: Played indoors (retractable roof closed)
- Game attendance: 71,802
- Referee: John Hussey
- TV announcers (Fox): Dick Stockton, Mark Schlereth and Shannon Spake
- Recap, Gamebook

Game information

**First quarter**

- HOU – Kaʻimi Fairbairn 55-yard field goal, 9:08. Texans 3–0. **Drive: 7 plays, 30 yards, 4:16.**

**Second quarter**

- SF – Robbie Gould 52-yard field goal, 6:36. Tied 3–3. **Drive: 5 plays, 31 yards, 2:34.**
- SF – Carlos Hyde 2-yard run (Robbie Gould kick), 2:32. 49ers 10–3. **Drive: 6 plays, 68 yards, 3:05.**
- HOU – DeAndre Hopkins 7-yard pass from T. J. Yates (kick failed), 0:54. 49ers 10–9. **Drive: 9 plays, 75 yards, 1:38.**
- SF – Robbie Gould 35-yard field goal, 0:02. 49ers 13–9. **Drive: 6 plays, 62 yards, 0:52.**

**Third quarter**

- HOU – DeAndre Hopkins 29-yard pass from T. J. Yates (Kaʻimi Fairbairn kick), 12:11. Texans 16–13. **Drive: 6 plays, 75 yards, 2:49.**
- SF – Robbie Gould 25-yard field goal, 8:15. Tied 16–16. **Drive: 11 plays, 68 yards, 3:59.**
- SF – Garrett Celek 6-yard pass from Jimmy Garoppolo (Robbie Gould kick), 1:53. 49ers 23–16. **Drive: 6 plays, 85 yards, 3:33.**

**Fourth quarter**

- SF – Robbie Gould 41-yard field goal, 3:54. 49ers 26–16. **Drive: 4 plays, 9 yards, 1:46.**

**Top passers**

- SF – Jimmy Garoppolo – 20/33, 334 yards, TD, INT
- HOU – T. J. Yates – 14/26, 175 yards, 2 TD

**Top rushers**

- SF – Carlos Hyde – 14 carries, 78 yards, TD
- HOU – Lamar Miller – 18 carries, 54 yards

**Top receivers**

- SF – Marquise Goodwin – 6 receptions, 106 yards
- HOU – DeAndre Hopkins – 11 receptions, 149 yards, 2 TD

For the first time in 8 years, head coach Kyle Shanahan made his first return to Houston since leaving the Texans in 2010 to become the offensive coordinator for the Washington Redskins under his father, head coach Mike Shanahan. Kyle previously served as Houston's wide receivers coach in 2006, quarterbacks coach in 2007, and the offensive coordinator from 2008 to 2009 under then-head coach Gary Kubiak. The 49ers were now 3–10

==== Week 15: vs. Tennessee Titans ====
Week Fifteen: Tennessee Titans at San Francisco 49ers – Game summary

Quarter	1	2	3	4	Total
Titans	0	10	3	10	**23**
**49ers**	6	10	0	9	**25**

at Levi's Stadium, Santa Clara, California

- Date: December 17
- Game time: 1:25 pm. PST
- Game weather: 65 °F (18 °C), sunny
- Game attendance: 70,133
- Referee: John Parry
- TV announcers (CBS): Andrew Catalon and James Lofton
- Recap, Gamebook

Game information

**First quarter**

- SF – Robbie Gould 38-yard field goal, 8:51. 49ers 3–0. **Drive: 12 plays, 64 yards, 6:09.**
- SF – Robbie Gould 48-yard field goal, 4:35. 49ers 6–0. **Drive: 7 plays, 38 yards, 2:03.**

**Second quarter**

- TEN – Ryan Succop 40-yard field goal, 14:06. 49ers 6–3. **Drive: 12 plays, 53 yards, 5:29.**
- SF – Garrett Celek 5-yard pass from Jimmy Garoppolo (Robbie Gould kick), 5:30. 49ers 13–3. **Drive: 17 plays, 85 yards, 8:36.**
- SF – Robbie Gould 28-yard field goal, 1:37. 49ers 16–3. **Drive: 10 plays, 36 yards, 2:50.**
- TEN – Delanie Walker 4-yard pass from Marcus Mariota (Ryan Succop kick), 0:29. 49ers 16–10. **Drive: 6 plays, 79 yards, 1:08.**

**Third quarter**

- TEN – Ryan Succop 31-yard field goal, 8:29. 49ers 16–13. **Drive: 14 plays, 62 yards, 6:31.**

**Fourth quarter**

- TEN – Rishard Matthews 8-yard pass from Marcus Mariota (Ryan Succop kick), 13:31. Titans 20–16. **Drive: 12 plays, 84 yards, 7:01.**
- SF – Robbie Gould 50-yard field goal, 8:27. Titans 20–19. **Drive: 8 plays, 51 yards, 5:04.**
- SF – Robbie Gould 48-yard field goal, 3:08. 49ers 22–20. **Drive: 7 plays, 57 yards, 3:20.**
- TEN – Ryan Succop 50-yard field goal, 1:07. Titans 23–22. **Drive: 11 plays, 43 yards, 2:01.**
- SF – Robbie Gould 45-yard field goal, 0:00. 49ers 25–23. **Drive: 7 plays, 48 yards, 1:07.**

**Top passers**

- TEN – Marcus Mariota – 23/33, 241 yards, 2 TD
- SF – Jimmy Garoppolo – 31/43, 381 yards, TD

**Top rushers**

- TEN – DeMarco Murray – 18 carries, 59 yards
- SF – Carlos Hyde – 16 carries, 25 yards

**Top receivers**

- TEN – Rishard Matthews – 6 receptions, 95 yards, TD
- SF – Marquise Goodwin – 10 receptions, 114 yards

**Top tacklers**

- TEN –
- SF –

Gould's kick sent the 49ers to 4–10

==== Week 16: vs. Jacksonville Jaguars ====
Week Sixteen: Jacksonville Jaguars at San Francisco 49ers – Game summary

Quarter	1	2	3	4	Total
Jaguars	0	16	3	14	**33**
**49ers**	10	6	7	21	**44**

at Levi's Stadium, Santa Clara, California

- Date: December 24
- Game time: 1:05 pm. PST
- Game weather: 52 °F (11 °C), cloudy
- Game attendance: 70,133
- Referee: Jeff Triplette
- TV announcers (CBS): Andrew Catalon and James Lofton
- Recap, Gamebook

Game information

**First quarter**

- SF – Jimmy Garoppolo 1-yard run (Robbie Gould kick), 10:20. 49ers 7–0. **Drive: 10 plays, 79 yards, 4:42.**
- SF – Robbie Gould 27-yard field goal, 5:46. 49ers 10–0. **Drive: 9 plays, 54 yards, 3:42.**

**Second quarter**

- SF – Dontae Johnson 50-yard interception return, 11:13. 49ers 16–0.
- JAX - Robbie Gould PAT blocked, returned by Aaron Colvin for 2-point conversion, 49ers 16–2.
- JAX – Leonard Fournette 1-yard run (Josh Lambo kick), 5:21. 49ers 16–9. **Drive: 11 plays, 75 yards, 5:53.**
- JAX – Jaelen Strong 5-yard pass from Blake Bortles (Josh Lambo kick), 0:14. Tied 16–16. **Drive: 8 plays, 80 yards, 1:30.**

**Third quarter**

- JAX – Josh Lambo 45-yard field goal, 11:02. Jaguars 19–16. **Drive: 8 plays, 45 yards, 4:03.**
- SF – George Kittle 8-yard pass from Jimmy Garoppolo (Robbie Gould kick), 6:51. 49ers 23–19. **Drive: 5 plays, 26 yards, 1:55.**

**Fourth quarter**

- SF – Trent Taylor 5-yard pass from Jimmy Garoppolo (Robbie Gould kick), 10:42. 49ers 30–19. **Drive: 13 plays, 86 yards, 6:27.**
- SF – Carlos Hyde 6-yard run (Robbie Gould kick), 9:03. 49ers 37–19. **Drive: 3 plays, 18 yards, 1:24.**
- JAX – T.J. Yeldon 1-yard run (Blake Bortles to Ben Koyack, pass succeeded), 2:20. 49ers 37–27. **Drive: 16 plays, 85 yards, 4:14.**
- JAX – James O'Shaughnessy 11-yard pass from Blake Bortles (kick failed, hit right upright), 1:54. 49ers 37–33. **Drive: 3 plays, 46 yards, 0:27.**
- SF – Matt Breida 30-yard run (Robbie Gould kick), 1:31. 49ers 44–33. **Drive: 4 plays, 51 yards, 0:26.**

**Top passers**

- JAX – Blake Bortles – 32/50, 382 yards, 2 TD, 3 INT
- SF – Jimmy Garoppolo – 21/30, 242 yards, 2 TD, INT

**Top rushers**

- JAX – Leonard Fournette – 18 carries, 48 yards, TD
- SF – Matt Breida – 11 carries, 74 yards, TD

**Top receivers**

- JAX – Keelan Cole – 6 receptions, 108 yards
- SF – Kyle Juszczyk – 5 receptions, 76 yards

**Top tacklers**

- JAX – Calais Campbell – 5 tackles, 3 assists
- SF – Adrian Colbert – 6 tackles

Jimmy G kept the momentum in Levi's Season finale and put the 49ers at 5–10

==== Week 17: at Los Angeles Rams ====
Week Seventeen: San Francisco 49ers at Los Angeles Rams – Game summary

Quarter	1	2	3	4	Total
**49ers**	10	10	7	7	**34**
Rams	3	3	0	7	**13**

at Los Angeles Memorial Coliseum, Los Angeles, California

- Date: December 31
- Game time: 1:25 pm. PST
- Game weather: 67 °F (19 °C), sunny
- Game attendance: 66,125
- Referee: Terry McAulay
- TV announcers (Fox): Joe Davis, Brady Quinn and Jenny Taft
- Recap, Gamebook

Game information

**First quarter**

- SF – Robbie Gould 33-yard field goal, 12:08. 49ers 3–0. **Drive: 8 plays, 60 yards, 2:52.**
- SF – Marquise Goodwin 8-yard pass from Jimmy Garoppolo (Robbie Gould kick), 5:14. 49ers 10–0. **Drive: 8 plays, 82 yards, 4:27.**
- LAR – Sam Ficken 23-yard field goal, 1:11. 49ers 10–3. **Drive: 6 plays, 17 yards, 2:13.**

**Second quarter**

- SF – Robbie Gould 48-yard field goal, 5:00. 49ers 13–3. **Drive: 11 plays, 67 yards, 4:52.**
- SF – Carlos Hyde 8-yard run (Robbie Gould kick), 1:13. 49ers 20–3. **Drive: 3 plays, 57 yards, 1:00.**
- LAR – Sam Ficken 21-yard field goal, 0:00. 49ers 20–6. **Drive: 2 plays, 50 yards, 0:09.**

**Third quarter**

- SF – Carlos Hyde 5-yard run (Robbie Gould kick), 6:12. 49ers 27–6. **Drive: 7 plays, 60 yards, 2:33.**

**Fourth quarter**

- SF – Aldrick Robinson 12-yard pass from Jimmy Garoppolo (Robbie Gould kick), 14:54. 49ers 34–6. **Drive: 7 plays, 53 yards, 3:39.**
- LAR – Lance Dunbar 8-yard run (Sam Ficken kick), 6:40. 49ers 34–13. **Drive: 15 plays, 72 yards, 8:14.**

**Top passers**

- SF – Jimmy Garoppolo – 20/33, 292 yards, 2 TD, 2 INT
- LAR – Sean Mannion – 20/34, 169 yards

**Top rushers**

- SF – Carlos Hyde – 15 carries, 88 yards, 2 TD
- LAR – Malcolm Brown – 14 carries, 54 yards

**Top receivers**

- SF – George Kittle – 4 receptions, 100 yards
- LAR – Malcolm Brown – 4 receptions, 7 yards

**Top tacklers**

- SF –
- LAR –

With the win, the Niners finished their season 6–10. Jimmy Garoppolo became the first NFL quarterback to go 7–0 in his first seven starts since Ben Roethlisberger in 2004.

=== Standings ===
==== Division ====
NFC West
	W	L	T	PCT	DIV	CONF	PF	PA	STK
^{(3)} Los Angeles Rams	11	5	0	.688	4–2	7–5	478	329	L1
Seattle Seahawks	9	7	0	.563	4–2	7–5	366	332	L1
Arizona Cardinals	8	8	0	.500	3–3	5–7	295	361	W2
San Francisco 49ers	6	10	0	.375	1–5	3–9	331	383	W5

==== Conference ====
NFC
#	Team	Division	W	L	T	PCT	DIV	CONF	SOS	SOV	STK
**Division leaders**
1 (Note: Philadelphia claimed the No. 1 seed over Minnesota based on winning percentage vs. common opponents. Philadelphia's cumulative record against Carolina, Chicago, the Los Angeles Rams and Washington was 5–0, compared to Minnesota's 4–1 cumulative record against the same four teams.)	Philadelphia Eagles	East	13	3	0	.813	5–1	10–2	.461	.433	L1
2	Minnesota Vikings	North	13	3	0	.813	5–1	10–2	.492	.447	W3
3 (Note: LA Rams claimed the No. 3 seed over New Orleans based on head-to-head victory.)	Los Angeles Rams	West	11	5	0	.688	4–2	7–5	.504	.460	L1
4 (Note: New Orleans clinched the NFC South division over Carolina based on head-to-head sweep.)	New Orleans Saints	South	11	5	0	.688	4–2	8–4	.535	.483	L1
**Wild Cards**
5	Carolina Panthers	South	11	5	0	.688	3–3	7–5	.539	.500	L1
6	Atlanta Falcons	South	10	6	0	.625	4–2	9–3	.543	.475	W1
**Did not qualify for the postseason**
7 (Note: Detroit finished ahead of Dallas and Seattle based on conference record, while Seattle finished ahead of Dallas based on head-to-head victory.)	Detroit Lions	North	9	7	0	.563	5–1	8–4	.496	.368	W1
8	Seattle Seahawks	West	9	7	0	.563	4–2	7–5	.492	.444	L1
9	Dallas Cowboys	East	9	7	0	.563	5–1	7–5	.496	.438	W1
10	Arizona Cardinals	West	8	8	0	.500	3–3	5–7	.488	.406	W2
11 (Note: Green Bay finished ahead of Washington based on record vs. common opponents. Green Bay's cumulative record against Dallas, Minnesota, New Orleans and Seattle was 2–3, compared to Washington's 1–4 cumulative record against the same four teams.)	Green Bay Packers	North	7	9	0	.438	2–4	5–7	.539	.357	L3
12	Washington Redskins	East	7	9	0	.438	1–5	5–7	.539	.429	L1
13	San Francisco 49ers	West	6	10	0	.375	1–5	3–9	.512	.438	W5
14 (Note: Tampa Bay finished ahead of Chicago based on head-to-head victory.)	Tampa Bay Buccaneers	South	5	11	0	.313	1–5	3–9	.555	.375	W1
15	Chicago Bears	North	5	11	0	.313	0–6	1–11	.559	.500	L1
16	New York Giants	East	3	13	0	.188	1–5	1–11	.531	.458	W1
**Tiebreakers** (Note: When breaking ties for three or more teams under the NFL's rules, they are first broken within divisions, then comparing only the highest-ranked remaining team from each division.)
