= DeBartolo =

DeBartolo is a surname. Notable people with the surname include:

- Anthony DeBartolo, writer for The Chicago Tribune and other publications
- Denise DeBartolo York, current owner of the San Francisco 49ers, sister of Ed DeBartolo Jr.
- Dick DeBartolo, writer for Mad Magazine
- Edward J. DeBartolo Sr., developer of shopping centers
- Edward J. DeBartolo Jr., former owner of the San Francisco 49ers football team, son of Edward J. DeBartolo Sr.
- Gavin DeBartolo, Australian rugby player
- Tiffanie DeBartolo, American novelist, daughter of Edward J. DeBartolo Jr.
