= List of members of the Italian American Sports Hall of Fame =

This is a list of members of the National Italian American Sports Hall of Fame.

== A ==
- Ed Abbaticchio, baseball player
- Ben Abruzzo, balloonist
- Mike Adamle, gridiron football
- Lou Albano, professional wrestler and manager
- Joey Amalfitano, baseball player
- Joe Amato, dragster racer
- Lou Ambers, boxer
- Alan Ameche, football player
- John Andretti, race car driver
- Mario Andretti, race car driver
- Michael Andretti, race car driver
- Sammy Angott, boxer
- Johnny Antonelli, baseball player
- Vito Antuofermo, boxer
- Eddie Arcaro, jockey
- Bob Aspromonte, baseball player
- Ken Aspromonte, baseball player
- Charles Atlas, bodybuilder
- Geno Auriemma, basketball coach

== B ==
- Sal Bando, baseball player
- Ray Barbuti, middle-distance runner
- Tom Barrasso, hockey player
- Carmen Basilio, boxer
- Bat Battalino, boxer
- Mark Bavaro, football player
- Gary Beban, football quarterback
- Joe Bellino, football halfback
- Nino Benvenuti, boxing
- John Beradino, baseball player and actor
- Yogi Berra, baseball player
- Angelo Bertelli, football quarterback
- Missie Berteotti, golfer
- Dan Biasone, basketball executive
- Craig Biggio, baseball
- Matt Biondi, swimmer
- Ping Bodie, baseball player
- Brian Boitano, figure skater
- Nick Bollettieri, tennis coach
- Zeke Bonura, baseball player and thrower
- Ralph Branca, baseball pitcher
- Lawrence Brignolia, marathon runner
- Gene Brito, football player
- Doug Bruno, basketball
- Tedy Bruschi, football player
- Doug Buffone, football player
- Nick Buoniconti, football player

== C ==
- John Calipari, basketball coach
- Dolph Camilli, baseball player
- Roy Campanella, baseball player
- Lou Campi, professional bowler
- Tony Canadeo, football player
- Tony Canzoneri, boxer
- Donna Caponi, LPGA golfer
- Gino Cappelletti, football player
- John Cappelletti, football player
- Jennifer Capriati, tennis player
- Gina Carano, MMA fighter
- Glenn Carano, football player
- Harry Caray, baseball commentator
- Frankie Carideo, football player
- Mary Carillo, tennis player
- Primo Carnera, boxer and wrestler
- Lou Carnesecca, basketball coach
- John Carpino, baseball executive
- Rick Casares, football player
- Phil Cavarretta, baseball player
- Al Cervi, basketball player and coach
- Giorgio Chinaglia, soccer player
- Dino Ciccarelli, hockey player
- Jean Cione, women's baseball player
- Jerry Colangelo, basketball executive
- Rocky Colavito, baseball player
- Ned Colletti, baseball executive
- Frank Coltiletti, jockey
- Franco Columbu, bodybuilder
- Rocco B. Commisso, soccer player
- Tony Conigliaro, baseball player
- Young Corbett III, boxer
- Jim Corno, broadcasting executive
- Fred Couples, golfer
- Jim Covert, football player
- Frank Crosetti, baseball shortstop
- Tony Cuccinello, baseball player
- Pete Cutino, water polo coach
- Bobby Czyz, boxer

== D ==
- Constantine "Cus" D'Amato, boxing trainer
- Eddie DeBartolo, football owner
- Michael DeCicco, fencing coach
- Alexis DeJoria, racecar driver
- Vinny Del Negro, basketball coach
- Alex Delvecchio, hockey player
- Tony DeMarco, boxer
- Frank Demaree, baseball player
- Joe DeNucci, boxer
- Ralph DePalma, racecar driver
- Peter DePaolo, racecar driver
- Red DiBernardi, basketball player
- Buttercup Dickerson, first Italian in MLB
- Ernie DiGregorio, basketball player
- Dom DiMaggio, baseball player
- Joe DiMaggio, baseball player
- Vince DiMaggio, baseball player
- Angelo Dundee, boxing cornerman
- Johnny Dundee, boxer
- Lou Duva, boxing trainer

== E ==
- Mike Eruzione, hockey player
- Phil Esposito, hockey player
- Tony Esposito, hockey player

== F ==
- Buzz Fazio, bowler
- Vince Ferragamo, football quarterback
- Dave Ferraro, bowler
- Lou Ferrigno, bodybuilder
- Doug Ford, golfer
- Chet Forte, talk radio host
- Joe Fortunato, football player
- John Franco, baseball reliever
- Mike Fratello, basketball coach
- Linda Fratianne, figure skater
- Jim Fregosi, baseball player and manager
- Carl Furillo, baseball player

== G ==
- Gary Gaetti, baseball player
- John Gagliardi, college football coach
- Chip Ganassi, racecar driver
- Joe Garagiola, baseball catcher
- Eleanor Garatti-Seville, swimmer
- Arturo Gatti, boxer
- Frankie Genaro, boxer
- Eddie Giacomin, hockey player
- A. Bartlett Giamatti, MLB commissioner
- Joey Giardello, boxer
- Joe Girardi, baseball player and manager
- Margaret Gisolo, child baseball player
- Andy Granatelli, CEO of STP
- Cammi Granato, hockey player
- Rocky Graziano, boxer

== H ==
- Franco Harris, football player
- Ted Hendricks, football player
- Pete Herman, boxer
- Kelly Amonte Hiller, lacrosse player and coach

== I ==
- Tom Izzo, basketball coach

== J ==
- Harry Jeffra, boxer

== K ==
- Ed Kelly, basketball player and superintendent

== L ==
- Fidel La Barba, boxer
- Tony La Russa, baseball player and manager
- Daryle Lamonica, football player
- Lou Lamoriello, hockey executive
- Jake LaMotta, boxer
- Tommy Lasorda, baseball player and manager
- Hank Lauricella, college football player
- Dante Lavelli, football player
- Tony Lazzeri, baseball player
- Marty Liquori, track athlete
- Lou Little, football player
- Ernie Lombardi, baseball player
- Vince Lombardi, football coach
- DDonna Lopiano, women's sports
- Larry Lucchino, MLB owner
- Mike Lucci, football player
- Hank Luisetti, basketball player

== M ==
- Sal Maglie, baseball player
- Paulie Malignaggi, boxer
- Lenny Mancini, boxer
- Ray Mancini, boxer
- Gus Mancuso, baseball player
- Sammy Mandell, boxer
- Mike Manganello, jockey
- Gino Marchetti, football player
- Rocky Marciano, boxer
- Ed Marinaro, football player
- Dan Marino, football player
- Hank Marino, bowler
- John Mariucci, hockey player
- Penny Marshall, film director
- Billy Martin, baseball player
- Rollie Massimino, basketball coach
- Linda Mastandrea, Paralympic athlete
- Joey Maxim, boxer
- Phil Mickelson, golfer
- Mike Modano, hockey player
- Joe Montana, football player
- Willie Mosconi, billiard player
- George Musso, football player
- Johnny Musso, football player

== N ==
- Vince Naimoli, business man
- Lou Nanne, hockey player and executive
- Maude Nelson, baseball player
- Leo Nomellini, football player
- Susan Notorangelo, bike racer

== O ==
- Eddie Olczyk, hockey player

== P ==
- Steve Palermo, baseball umpire
- John Panelli, football player
- Babe Parilli, football player
- Dan Pastorini, football player
- Joe Paterno, football coach
- Vinny Pazienza, boxer
- Vincent Pazzetti, football player
- Stefano Pelinga, billiards player
- Willie Pep, boxer
- Joe Pepitone, baseball player
- Cavino Michelli Petillo, racing driver
- Johnny Petraglia, bowler
- Joe Petrali, motorcycle racer
- Rico Petrocelli, baseball player
- Mike Piazza, baseball player
- Brian Piccolo, football player
- Ralph "Babe" Pinelli, baseball player
- Gene Pingatore, basketball coach
- Scott Pioli, football executive
- Tom Pistone, racecar driver
- Rick Pitino, basketball coach
- Angelo Pizzo, screenwriter
- Angelo Poffo, wrestler

== R ==
- Vic Raschi, baseball player
- Mark Recchi, hockey player
- Lindy Remigino, track athlete
- Mary Lou Retton, gymnastics
- Dave Righetti, baseball player and coach
- Mike Rizzo, baseball executive
- Phil Rizzuto, baseball player
- Andy Robustelli, football player
- Giuseppe Rossi, soccer player
- Angela Ruggiero, hockey player

== S ==
- Alicia Sacramone, gymnast
- Joan Salvato Wulff, fly fisher
- Carmen Salvino, bowler
- Bruno Sammartino, wrestler
- Ron Santo, baseball player
- Joey Saputo, soccer executive
- Gene Sarazen, golfer
- Randy Savage, wrestler
- Mike Scioscia, baseball manager
- John Smith, wrestler
- John Smoltz, baseball player
- Sean P. Stellato, sports business

== T ==
- Paul Tagliabue, football executive
- Mario "Motts" Tonelli, football player
- Joe Torre, baseball player
- Gino Torretta, football player
- Mario Trafeli, speed skater
- Charley Trippi, football player

== V ==
- Sonny Vaccaro, basketball scout
- Bobby Valentine, baseball manager
- Vito Valentinetti, baseball player
- Jim Valvano, basketball coach
- Andy Varipapa, bowler
- Ken Venturi, golfer
- Dick Vermeil, football coach
- Phil Villapiano, football player
- Frank Viola, baseball player
- Dick Vitale, sports announcer

== W ==
- Johnny Wilson, boxer

== Y ==
- Denise DeBartolo York, NFL owner

== Z ==
- Frank Zamboni, inventor
- Louis Zamperini, Olympic runner
- Barry Zito, baseball player
