= Tiffanie DeBartolo =

American novelist

- Born: Tiffanie DeBartolo; November 27, 1970 (age 55); Youngstown, Ohio, U.S.
- Education: Villa Maria High School; University of California, Berkeley (BA)
- Occupations: Novelist; Filmmaker; Record label co-founder
- Spouse: Scott Schumaker
- Relatives: Edward J. DeBartolo, Jr. (father); Edward J. DeBartolo, Sr. (grandfather); Denise DeBartolo York (aunt); John York (uncle); Jed York (cousin)
- Writing career
- Language: English
- Years active: 2002–present
- Period: 21st century
- Genre: Fiction
- Subject: Music

Tiffanie DeBartolo (born November 27, 1970) is an American novelist, filmmaker, co-founder of the independent record label Bright Antenna, and co-founder of The ShineMaker Foundation. She has written three novels: God-Shaped Hole, How To Kill a Rock Star, and Sorrow. DeBartolo wrote and directed the 1996 film Dream for an Insomniac starring Ione Skye and Jennifer Aniston. She also penned the text to the graphic novel GRACE: The Jeff Buckley Story, which was released in April 2019.

== Biography ==
DeBartolo is the daughter of former San Francisco 49ers owner Edward J. DeBartolo, Jr. She attended the all-girls Villa Maria High School and dropped out her senior year when she was not allowed to graduate early. DeBartolo later obtained her GED and graduated from UC Berkeley with a philosophy degree, then moved to Los Angeles. She has previously lived in New York City and Boulder, Colorado, and now resides in the San Francisco Bay Area. DeBartolo's novel writing career began after her screenwriting/directorial debut, with God-Shaped Hole (2002) and How to Kill a Rock Star (2005), both from Sourcebooks Landmark. Sidney Sheldon has praised DeBartolo's sophomore novel, saying it has "Wonderful characters wrapped up in a story that moves like an express train". God-Shaped Hole was published in the UK as The Shape of My Heart. In 2020, DeBartolo released Sorrow published by Woodhall Press. Sorrow was inspired by the song of the same name by The National from their 2010 album High Violet. She also wrote the text for Grace: Based on the Jeff Buckley Story, a graphic novel about American musician Jeff Buckley (2019).

== Bright Antenna ==
DeBartolo is one of the owners of the Indie music record label Bright Antenna, which has released music by Sports Team, Middle Class Rut, PREP, The Wombats, Fana Hues, Roman Lewis, Wilderado, Orchestral Manoeuvres in the Dark, Flagship, In The Valley Below, Beware of Darkness, Jimmy Gnecco of OURS, and Cheerleader.

== ShineMaker Foundation ==
DeBartolo is the co-founder of the ShineMaker Foundation which she started along with her husband Scott Schumaker.

== Publications ==
- DeBartolo, Tiffanie. Sorrow. Woodhall Press LLP, 2020.
- DeBartolo, Tiffanie. Grace: Based on the Jeff Buckley Story. First Second, 2019.
- DeBartolo, Tiffanie. How to Kill a Rockstar. Sourcebooks Landmark, 2005.
- DeBartolo, Tiffanie. God Shaped Hole. Sourcebooks Landmark, 2002
