= Hank Marino =

American ten-pin bowler

Enrico Salvano "Hank" Marino (November 27, 1889 - July 12, 1976) was one of the world's top ten-pin bowling champions of the 1930s, with a career that lasted half a century.

Born in Palermo, Sicily, Marino came to Chicago when he was 11 years old, and started bowling in 1912 while working as a barber. Within four years he had won his first bowling championship, the 1916 American Bowling Congress Doubles, becoming known as "the Italian Wonder of Bowling".

In 1930 Marino moved to Milwaukee to open a bowling alley, but joined the Heil Products team and soon became a global star on the bowling circuit. On May 20, 1935 he won the BPAA national match game singles title, holding it for 2 1/2 years before surrendering it on December 19, 1937, and retiring undefeated in January 1938. Meanwhile, in 1936 he took the All Events Title at the International Bowling Association Tournament in Berlin, Germany, while his team the Milwaukee Heils (including Ned Day and Charley Daw) won the team title.

Marino was elected a charter member of the bowling Hall of the Fame in 1941, polling the largest number of votes. In 1951 a national newspaper poll named him Bowler of the Half-Century. The 1999 Bowlers Journal ranking of 20th Century bowlers rated him #4.

Marino rolled five 800 series and 11 300 games. In 1971 he received the Flowers for the Living Award and was inducted into the Wisconsin Bowling Hall of Fame in 1992. He was elected to the National Italian American Sports Hall of Fame in 1980.

Around 1941 he marketed Hank Marino's Miniature Bowling Alley.
