= Edward J. DeBartolo Jr. =

American businessman

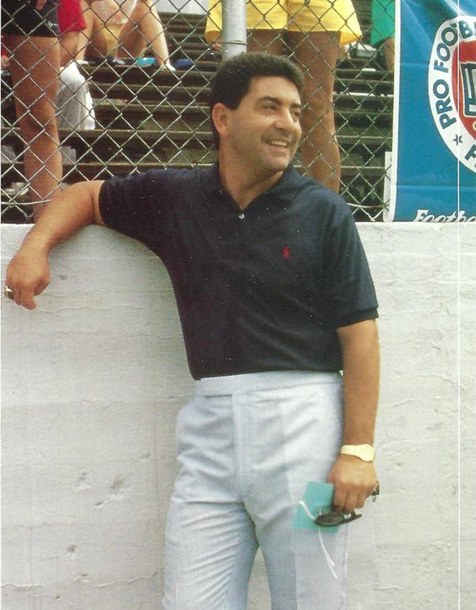
- DeBartolo in 1988
- Born: Edward John DeBartolo Jr. November 6, 1946 (age 80); Youngstown, Ohio, U.S.
- Education: University of Notre Dame
- Occupation: Businessman
- Known for: Co-founder and CEO of Simon DeBartolo Group
- Spouse: Candy DeBartolo (m. 1968)
- Children: Lisa, Nicole, Tiffanie
- Parents: Edward J. DeBartolo Sr. (father); Marie Patricia Montani DeBartolo (mother)
- Relatives: Denise DeBartolo York (sister); Jed York (nephew)
- Football career

Career history
- San Francisco 49ers (1977–2000); Principal owner (1977–2000); President (1977–1982, 1988–1990)

Awards and highlights
- 5× Super Bowl champion (XVI, XIX, XXIII, XXIV, XXIX); San Francisco 49ers Hall of Fame; Italian American Sports Hall of Fame; Bay Area Sports Hall of Fame (2008)
- Pro Football Hall of Fame

Edward John DeBartolo Jr. (born November 6, 1946) is an American businessman best known for his 23-year ownership of the San Francisco 49ers of the National Football League (NFL). On February 6, 2016, DeBartolo was elected to the Pro Football Hall of Fame as a contributor.

DeBartolo was involved in the 1998 corruption case of former Louisiana governor Edwin Edwards. DeBartolo pleaded guilty to a charge of failing to report a felony and received a $1 million fine along with two years of probation in return for his testimony against Edwards. DeBartolo was fined by the NFL and barred from active control of the 49ers for a year. On February 18, 2020, President Donald Trump granted DeBartolo a presidential pardon.

== Early life ==
DeBartolo was born and raised in Youngstown, Ohio, the son of Marie Patricia (Montani) and Edward J. DeBartolo Sr., a real estate developer. He went to high school at Cardinal Mooney.

== Career ==
DeBartolo developed shopping malls as part of a corporation founded by his father, Edward J. DeBartolo Sr. The Edward J. DeBartolo Corporation became one of the largest public real estate businesses in the United States, at one point controlling over two billion square feet of retail real estate space nationwide.

DeBartolo was actively involved in franchise ownership and sports management, becoming one of the most successful and generous owners in professional sports. His ownership of the 49ers proved especially notable. During DeBartolo's 23 years owning the team beginning in 1977, the team won an unprecedented five Super Bowls under coaches Bill Walsh and George Seifert: Super Bowl XVI in 1982, XIX in 1985, XXIII in 1989, XXIV 1990, and XXIX in 1995. From the early 1980s through the mid-1990s, DeBartolo presided over a team that had the most wins within a decade in football history.

According to 49ers quarterback Steve Young, DeBartolo's "family approach" to running the team changed the landscape of the NFL. Under it, "the players were what mattered", and that changed the face of the sport as other teams began to follow the 49ers' model. "In most of the league, the players were chattel. What I see in the league today are owners who have made their players partners. That changes the nature of the NFL." DeBartolo affirms this, saying: "I tried to run the 49ers like a family rather than a business. I viewed the players and myself really, basically, as a partnership. Our goal was to win the Super Bowl every year, and we had to do that together."

=== Financial and legal troubles ===
In 1991, DeBartolo arranged to sell the family-owned Pittsburgh Penguins National Hockey League franchise to assist the DeBartolo Corporation in the aftermath of the real estate collapse of 1987. His sister, Denise DeBartolo York, had served as president. Five years later, many family-owned shopping malls were sold to the Simon Property Group, which operated for a few years as the Simon DeBartolo Group.

In 1992, DeBartolo was accused of sexual assault at his Menlo Park condo by a cocktail waitress he met at a local bar. The married DeBartolo, who denied any wrongdoing, was never charged but reportedly paid $200,000 to settle the case out of court.

DeBartolo was involved in the 1998 corruption case of Edwin Edwards, former governor of Louisiana. DeBartolo pleaded guilty to a charge of failing to report a felony, and received a $1 million fine and two years of probation in return for his testimony against Edwards. Edwards was on trial for extortion and other charges, among which were the $400,000 he demanded from DeBartolo to gain a riverboat casino license. DeBartolo received the license, but withdrew from the casino project after he was subpoenaed during the subsequent bribery investigation. DeBartolo was fined by the NFL, and barred from active control of the 49ers for a year.

DeBartolo could have returned to the team, but instead ceded control of the franchise to his sister, Denise York, in 2000, in return for other parts of the family business empire. In spite of the public perception that the transfer had been forced by the league, DeBartolo confirms it was voluntary:

...Truthfully, the team really wasn't taken away from me. I think it's been a misnomer for many many years. Commissioner Tagliabue did obviously suspend me, but as I was going through negotiations with my family and we went through these negotiations and we went through them with lawyers, obviously and with a judge in Akron, Ohio. It did not come down to that team being taken, it came down to a decision that had to be made whether or not I wanted the 49ers or whether or not I wanted to take the other part of the company. And I figured at that time, and my sister Denise (49ers owner Denise York) was involved totally as was her family. I decided in that meeting in Akron Ohio, that I thought it would be best that I took the other side and my tenure with the 49ers would end then and end there. I don't know if that story has ever been told, it may have been, it may have not been. But, it really was a choice, I figured there was more to do with my life at that time. I had succeeded and done a lot with the 49ers. It meant the world to me, but I figured with my daughters, with them getting older and obviously with all of us getting older and having grandchildren at the time, and them planning on families, that it would be best for me to do what was best to be a good grandfather, be a good husband and dad, and do what I want to do and maybe travel a little bit and spend more time with my family.

Hall of Fame offensive tackle Anthony Muñoz of the Cincinnati Bengals attended a celebrity flag football game at Candlestick Park in 2014 — the last football event before the 49ers' old home was torn down, where he said:

The final touchdown pass, there were probably 30,000 people in that stadium viewing a bunch of old guys playing a flag football game, but to see (Montana) throw to (DeBartolo) for the final touchdown there and to hear the fans go crazy and to see the admiration from these former players like Ronnie Lott and Joe Montana; that to me was impressive ... to me, that's what it's all about.

February 2020 pardon granted by Donald Trump

On February 18, 2020, President Donald Trump granted DeBartolo a presidential pardon.

== Personal life ==
DeBartolo and his wife, Candy, have three daughters: Lisa, Nicole, and Tiffanie. Tiffanie is an author and the director of the film Dream for an Insomniac (1996). In 2007, DeBartolo co-founded Brooks-DeBartolo Collegiate High School in Tampa, Florida with fellow Pro Football Hall of Fame member Derrick Brooks.

DeBartolo also has a half-brother, Edward M. Kobel, who is the current president and COO of DeBartolo Development.

DeBartolo's mother was Marie Patricia Montani DeBartolo, in whose honor the DeBartolo Performing Arts Center at the University of Notre Dame was posthumously dedicated.

On December 1, 2024, Donald Trump nominated DeBartolo's son-in-law Chad Chronister, Sheriff of Hillsborough County, FL, as head of the U.S. Drug Enforcement Administration. However, Chronister withdrew his name from consideration a few days later.

== Awards and honors ==
- Five-time Super Bowl champion (as owner of the 49ers)
- Pro Football Hall of Fame (class of 2016)
- Bay Area Sports Hall of Fame (class of 2008)
- 49ers Hall of Fame (class of 2009)
- National Italian American hall of fame
