= Brooks-DeBartolo Collegiate High School =

Coordinates: 28.0523°N 82.4419°W

Location
- 10948 N. Central Avenue; Tampa, Florida 33612; United States

Information
- School type: Charter High School
- Motto: "Continuing the Tradition of Excellence"
- Established: 2007
- School district: Hillsborough County Public Schools
- Principal: Cheryl (Fernandez) Hyde
- Teaching staff: 34.00 (FTE)
- Grades: 9–12
- Enrollment: 593 (2023–2024)
- Student to teacher ratio: 17.44
- Colors: Garnet and Gold
- Mascot: Phoenix
- Website: bdchs.org

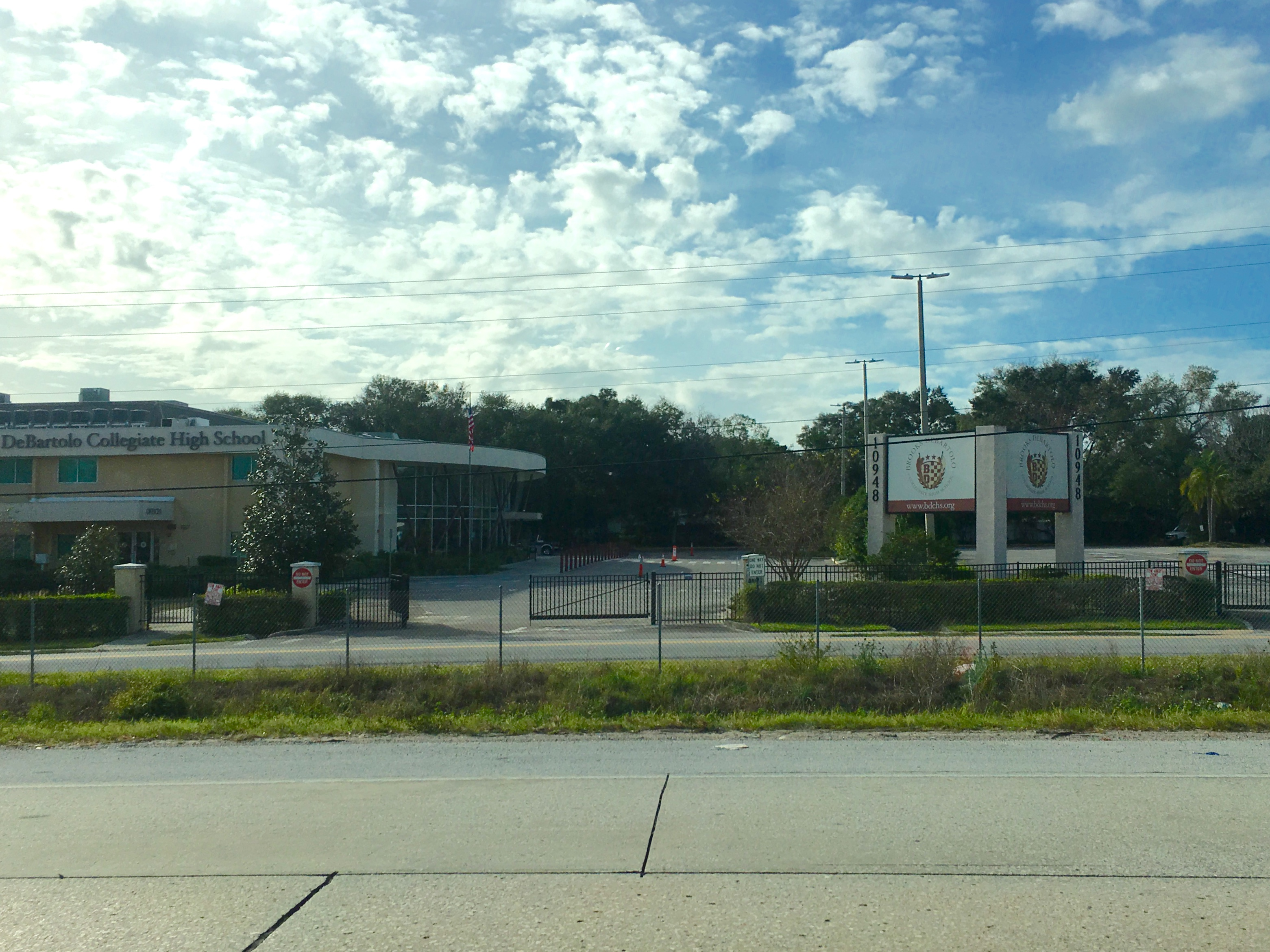
Brooks-DeBartolo Collegiate High School, January 2020

Brooks-DeBartolo Collegiate High School is a charter school in Tampa, Florida, United States, founded with support from former NFL player Derrick Brooks and former San Francisco 49ers owner Edward J. DeBartolo, Jr. Both of the founders are members of the Pro Football Hall of Fame. It is part of the Hillsborough County Public Schools system.

Brooks-DeBartolo Collegiate High School is a college preparatory school serving students in grades 9–12 in Tampa, FL. The school opened its doors during the 2007–2008 academic school year. The school is located at 10948 N. Central Avenue.

The current principal of Brooks-DeBartolo Collegiate High School is Cheryl (Fernandez) Hyde.

== History ==
In 2005, Tampa Bay Buccaneers linebacker Derrick Brooks and the Edward J. DeBartolo Family founded Brooks-DeBartolo Collegiate High School (BDCHS). Their goal was to open a school that would provide a high quality education, similar to that of the numerous private schools in Tampa, but without the staggering price and to provide a higher opportunity for achievement to students who may otherwise not excel in a large classroom setting.

Brooks-DeBartolo Collegiate High School became a reality in 2007, when the Charter application was approved by the Hillsborough County School Board. The school officially opened its doors in August 2007, becoming the only traditional charter high school in the Tampa Bay area. The inaugural student body consisted of 183 students in grades 9-11. Grade 12 was added the following year.

In 2008, BDCHS added athletics to its program. The school is now a full member of the Florida High School Athletic Association (FHSAA) and is eligible to participate in the State Championship Series in Class 3A District 10. BDCHS offers many sports, including cross country, volleyball, bowling, girls and boys basketball, softball, baseball, girls and boys soccer, tennis, and golf. In just three years of competition and only one year of post-season eligibility, the school has earned four Class 2A District 10 Runner-up trophies, as well as one Regional Championship and a State Finals appearance by the baseball and girls basketball teams.

In its fourth year, BDCHS was among eight Hillsborough County public high schools and 140 schools statewide that received an “A” grade from the Florida Department of Education. The school also graduated its first freshmen class in 2011, growing its alumni to more than 120 students. Many of these alumni were accepted to universities such as Howard University, Villanova University, University of Pittsburgh, the University of South Florida, University of Tampa, University of Florida, and Florida State University.

In 2012, BDCHS moved to an 11-acre campus and earned another A grade from the FLDOE. The school was named one of “America’s Most Challenging High Schools” by The Washington Post, a Non-Profit of the Year finalist by the Tampa Bay Business Journal, and the Golden School Award for parent volunteerism. In addition, the class of 2012, 2013, 2014, and 2019 graduates were all accepted into post-secondary institutions.

In 2015, BDCHS was awarded the National Blue Ribbon by the U.S. Department of Education.

In 2025, significant changes in the school began. The school no longer caters lunch. Students are also required to lock their phones in a Yondr pouch at the beginning of class along with no tolerance policies for usage of electronic devices.
