= Phil Cavarretta =

American baseball player and manager (1916–2010)

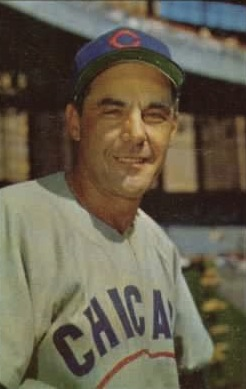
- Cavarretta c. 1953
- First baseman / Outfielder / Manager
- Born: July 19, 1916; Chicago, Illinois, U.S.
- Died: December 18, 2010 (aged 94); Lilburn, Georgia, U.S.
- Batted: Left Threw: Left

MLB debut
- September 16, 1934, for the Chicago Cubs

Last MLB appearance
- May 8, 1955, for the Chicago White Sox

MLB statistics
- Batting average: .293
- Home runs: 95
- Runs batted in: 920
- Stats at Baseball Reference

Teams
- As player: Chicago Cubs (1934–1953); Chicago White Sox (1954–1955); As manager: Chicago Cubs (1951–1953)

Career highlights and awards
- 4× All-Star (1944–1947); NL MVP (1945); NL batting champion (1945); Chicago Cubs Hall of Fame

Philip Joseph Cavarretta (July 19, 1916 – December 18, 2010) was an American professional baseball first baseman, outfielder, and manager. He was known to friends and family as "Phil" and was also called "Philibuck", a nickname bestowed by Cubs manager Charlie Grimm.

Cavarretta had a 22-year Major League Baseball (MLB) career, spending 20 seasons with the Chicago Cubs before spending his final two seasons with the Chicago White Sox. His 20 seasons played for the Cubs is the second-most in franchise history, behind Cap Anson's 22 seasons. Cavarretta was voted the National League Most Valuable Player for 1945 after leading the Cubs to the pennant while winning the batting title with a .355 batting average. He was a player-manager for the Cubs in his final three seasons with the team.

== Baseball career ==
1944 card of Cavarretta for Chicago Cubs

Cavaretta attended Lane Technical High School on Chicago's North Side (now known as Lane Tech College Prep), where he played baseball and basketball, and signed a professional contract with the Cubs before finishing high school. In his first professional game with Peoria at age 17 in 1934, Cavaretta hit for the cycle as a right fielder. That same year he was brought up to the Cubs to replace manager Charlie Grimm at first base. He first appeared in a major league game on September 16, 1934, less than two months after his 18th birthday, pinch-hitting unsuccessfully for the Cubs' shortstop Billy Jurges in the fifth inning of the first game of a doubleheader in Brooklyn. A week later, on September 25, in his first start and his first appearance at the Cubs' home park, Wrigley Field, Cavaretta hit a home run that supplied the winning margin in the Cubs' 1–0 win over Cincinnati. In his 1935 rookie season, he batted .275 with 82 runs batted in, also leading the league in double plays, as the Cubs captured their third pennant in seven years by winning 21 straight games in September; however, he batted only .125 in the World Series loss to the Detroit Tigers. Over the next several seasons he provided solid play at first base, routinely batting between .270 and .291 every season but one through 1943, though he lost significant playing time from 1938 to 1940 due to a hip injury and an ankle broken twice while sliding. In the 1938 World Series against the New York Yankees, he batted .462 as the Cubs were swept.

Exempted from World War II service because of a perforated eardrum, in 1944 Cavaretta batted .321 with a league-high 197 hits, had career highs with 106 runs, 35 doubles and 15 triples, and earned his first of four straight All-Star selections (reaching base a record five times in the game) though the Cubs suffered their fifth consecutive losing season. But the team improved by 23 games in 1945, edging the defending champion St. Louis Cardinals by three games for the pennant as Cavaretta was named MVP. That season he won the National League batting title, hitting .355. He also had a career-high 97 RBI, leading the NL in on-base percentage and finishing third in slugging average. He batted .423 in the World Series against the Tigers, though the Cubs again lost, in seven games. In Game 1, he singled and scored as the Cubs took a 4–0 lead in the first inning, singled and scored again in the third, and homered in the seventh as Chicago took the opener 9–0. He scored the Cubs' only run in Game 2, and in a 12-inning 8–7 win in Game 6 had a 2–RBI single and scored a run; he had three hits in Game 7, but the Cubs lost 9–3.

He made the All-Star team again in 1946 and 1947, batting .314 the latter year, as the Cubs again fell back in the standings. He was named manager in June 1951, succeeding Frankie Frisch. Continuing as manager for two more years, he compiled a record of 169–213. In 1953, his final season with the Cubs, he surpassed Stan Hack's modern team record of 1,938 games; Ernie Banks would eventually break his mark of 1,953 games in 1966. Cavarretta was fired during 1954 spring training after admitting the team was unlikely to finish above fifth place (they finished seventh), and in May he signed with the crosstown Chicago White Sox; he ended his career there in 1955.

== Legacy ==
In his 22-year major league career covering 2,030 games, Cavaretta compiled a .293 batting average (1,977-for-6,754) with 990 runs, 347 doubles, 99 triples, 95 home runs, 920 RBI, 65 stolen bases, 820 bases on balls, .372 on-base percentage and .416 slugging percentage. He finished his career with a .989 fielding percentage playing at first base and all three outfield positions. In three World Series (1935, 1938 and 1945) he hit .317 (20-for-63) with 9 runs, 3 doubles, 1 home run, 5 RBI and 4 walks.

He later managed in the minor leagues from 1956 to 1958 and again from 1965 to 1972, became a coach and scout with the Tigers, and was a New York Mets organizational hitting instructor.

Cavaretta was the last living player to have played against Babe Ruth in a major league game; he did so on May 12, 1935, against the Boston Braves. Since he ended his career in 1955, Cavaretta also had the distinction of being the only player who was active in the majors during both the final season of Babe Ruth in 1935 and the initial season of Hank Aaron in 1954.

== Death ==
On December 18, 2010, Cavarretta died of complications from a stroke. He was also battling leukemia at the time of his death.

== See also ==
- List of members of the Italian American Sports Hall of Fame
- List of Major League Baseball batting champions
- List of Major League Baseball player–managers
- Van Lingle Mungo (song)
