= Marcus Ball =

American football player (born 1987)

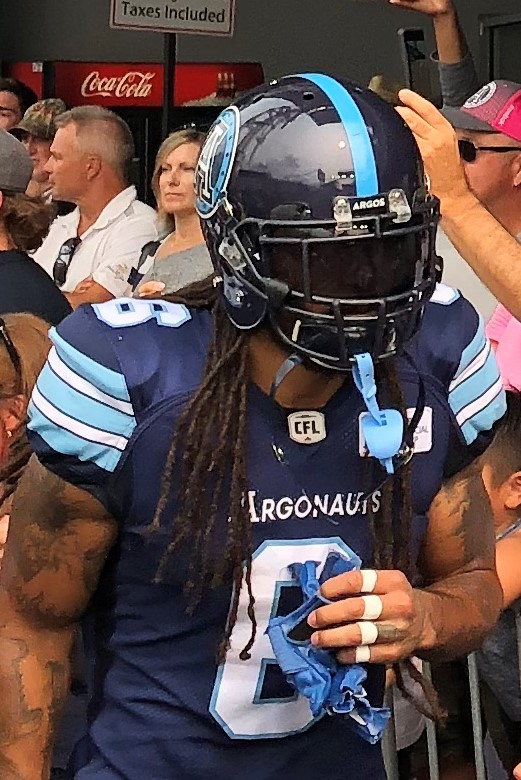
- Ball with the Toronto Argonauts in 2018

No. 6, 36, 46
- Position: Linebacker

Personal information
- Born: July 21, 1987 (age 39); Norfolk, Virginia, U.S.
- Listed height: 6 ft 1 in (1.85 m)
- Listed weight: 208 lb (94 kg)

Career information
- High school: Stephenson (Stone Mountain, Georgia)
- College: Memphis
- NFL draft: 2012: undrafted

Career history
- Toronto Argonauts (2012–2013); New Orleans Saints (2014); Carolina Panthers (2015–2016); Jacksonville Jaguars (2016)*; San Francisco 49ers (2016); Toronto Argonauts (2017–2018); Calgary Stampeders (2019)
- * Offseason or practice squad member only

Awards and highlights
- 2× Grey Cup champion (2012, 2017); CFL East All-Star (2017)

Career NFL statistics
- Total tackles: 20
- Fumble recoveries: 1
- Stats at Pro Football Reference
- Stats at CFL.ca

Marcus Ball (born July 21, 1987) is an American former professional football player who was a linebacker in the National Football League (CFL) and Canadian Football League (CFL). He played college football for the Florida State Seminoles, Pearl River Wildcats, and Memphis Tigers. Ball went unselected in the 2012 NFL draft but signed with the Toronto Argonauts of the CFL. Ball was also a member of the Calgary Stampeders of the CFL and the New Orleans Saints, Carolina Panthers, Jacksonville Jaguars, and San Francisco 49ers of the NFL.

== Professional career ==
=== Toronto Argonauts (first stint) ===
After going undrafted in the 2012 NFL draft Ball signed with Toronto Argonauts (CFL) on September 10, 2012. the In two seasons with the Toronto Argonauts (CFL), Ball had 142 tackles, seven sacks, three fumble recoveries, and four interceptions (with two touchdown returns). He was a key contributor to the defensive unit that helped the Argos to win the 100th Grey Cup at home in Toronto. On February 17, 2014, Ball was released by the Argonauts to pursue NFL opportunities.

=== New Orleans Saints ===
Ball signed a three-year contract with the New Orleans Saints on April 2, 2014, but was released on May 4, 2015.

=== Carolina Panthers ===
On May 21, 2015, Ball signed with the Carolina Panthers. On September 5, 2015, he was released by the Panthers. He was re-signed to the practice squad on September 29. During the 2015 season Ball was accused of threatening New York Giants wide receiver Odell Beckham Jr. while holding a baseball bat on the field prior to the game on December 20, 2015. On February 7, 2016, Ball's Panthers played in Super Bowl 50. In the game, the Panthers fell to the Denver Broncos by a score of 24–10. On February 9, 2016. Ball signed a futures contract with the Carolina Panthers. On September 3, 2016, Ball was waived by the Panthers as part of final roster cuts. The next day, he was signed to the Panthers' practice squad. On September 23, Ball was elevated to the active roster to replace injured teammate Dean Marlowe. He was released on September 27, 2016. He re-signed to the practice squad on September 29. He was released on October 12, 2016.

=== Jacksonville Jaguars ===
On October 12, 2016, Ball was signed to the Jacksonville Jaguars' practice squad. On October 24, Ball was waived by the Jaguars.

=== San Francisco 49ers ===
On November 22, 2016, Ball was signed to the San Francisco 49ers' practice squad. He was promoted to the active roster on November 29, 2016. On May 2, 2017, Ball was waived by the 49ers.

=== Toronto Argonauts (second stint) ===
On May 25, 2017, it was announced that Ball had signed with the Toronto Argonauts (CFL) at the start of the CFL training camp season. Ball was named a CFL East All-Star for his efforts during the 2017 CFL season, contributing with 57 defensive tackles, seven special teams tackles, two interceptions and one forced fumble. The following season, Ball played in 10 games for the Argos and amassed 44 defensive tackles. He missed the remainder of the season with a hamstring injury. He was not re-signed following the 2018 CFL season and became a free agent in February 2019.

=== Calgary Stampeders ===
On October 1, 2019, Ball signed with the Calgary Stampeders roughly two-thirds of the way through the 2019 CFL season. However, about two weeks later, it was revealed that Ball had suffered a torn ACL and would miss the remainder of the season.
