= Je'Ron Hamm =

American football player (born 1992)

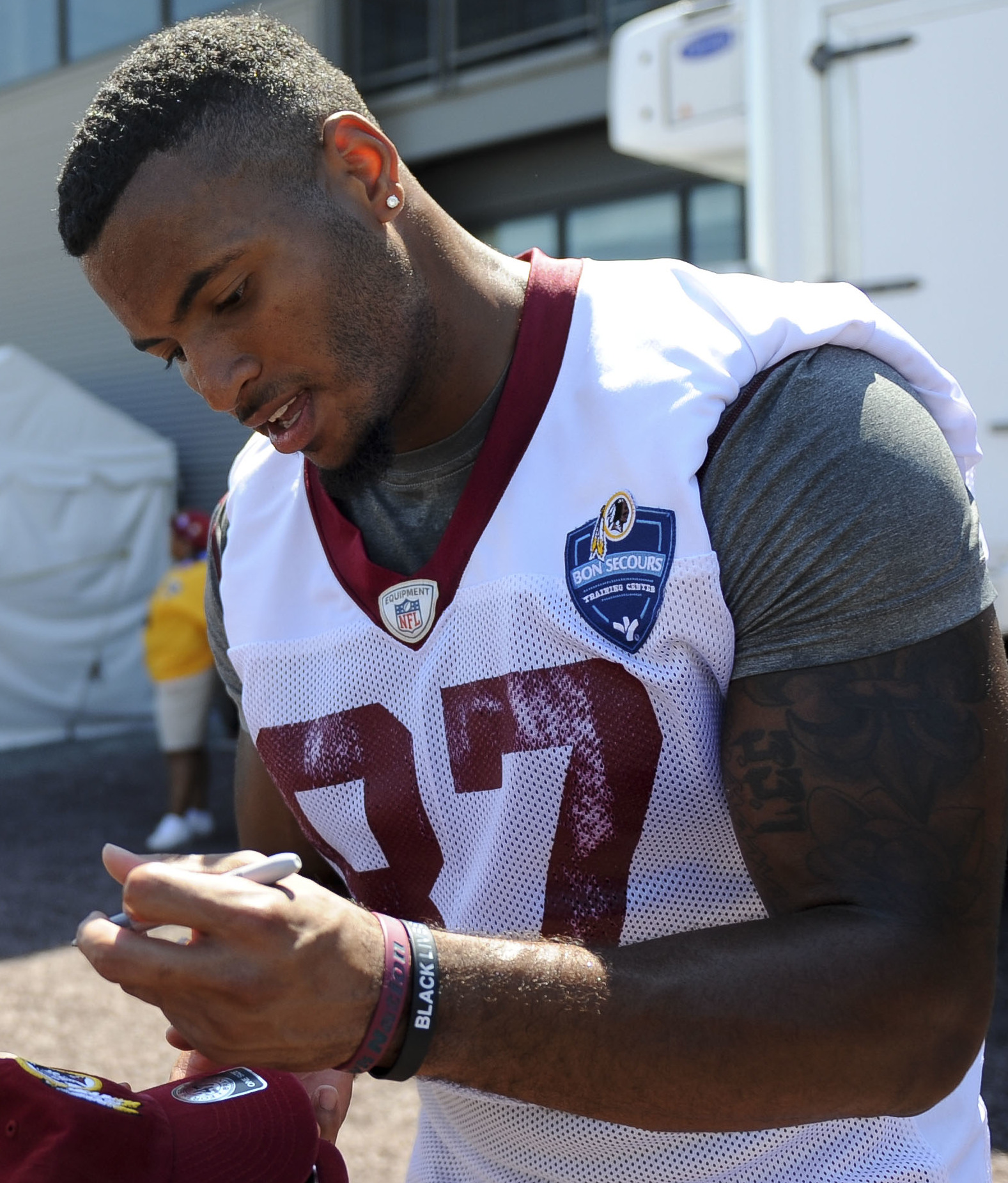
- Hamm with Redskins in 2015

No. 85, 87
- Position: Tight end

Personal information
- Born: June 15, 1992 (age 34); Sulzbach-Rosenberg, Germany
- Listed height: 6 ft 3 in (1.91 m)
- Listed weight: 236 lb (107 kg)

Career information
- High school: Leesville (LA)
- College: Louisiana–Monroe
- NFL draft: 2014: undrafted

Career history
- New Orleans Saints (2014)*; Washington Redskins (2014–2015); San Francisco 49ers (2015–2016); Seattle Seahawks (2018)*; Los Angeles Chargers (2018)*; Indianapolis Colts (2018)*
- * Offseason or practice squad member only

Career NFL statistics
- Receptions: 2
- Receiving yards: 13
- Stats at Pro Football Reference

Je’Ron Marquis Hamm (born June 15, 1992) is a former American football tight end. He was signed as an undrafted free agent by the New Orleans Saints in 2014. He played college football at the University of Louisiana at Monroe (ULM) as a wide receiver.

== Professional career ==
=== New Orleans Saints ===
After going undrafted in the 2014 NFL draft, Hamm signed with the New Orleans Saints on May 12, 2014. Having played wide receiver in college, the Saints converted him to the tight end position. On August 21, he was waived by the team.

=== Washington Redskins ===
The Washington Redskins signed Hamm to their practice squad on September 9, 2014. He signed a futures contract on December 29.

On September 5, 2015, Hamm was waived for final roster cuts before the start of the regular season and was signed to the Redskins' practice squad the next day. The Redskins promoted Hamm to the active roster on November 23, 2015. On December 29, 2015, Hamm was waived.

=== San Francisco 49ers ===
Hamm was claimed off waivers by the San Francisco 49ers on December 30, 2015.

On September 3, 2016, Hamm was released by the 49ers as part of final roster cuts. The next day, he was signed to the 49ers' practice squad. He was promoted to the active roster on October 1, 2016. On May 2, 2017, Hamm was waived by the 49ers.

=== Seattle Seahawks ===
On July 26, 2018, Hamm signed with the Seattle Seahawks. He was waived on August 2, 2018; although he was re-signed four days later, he was waived again on August 12, 2018.

=== Los Angeles Chargers ===
On August 13, 2018, Hamm was claimed off waivers by the Los Angeles Chargers. He was waived on September 1, 2018.

=== Indianapolis Colts ===
On November 21, 2018, Hamm was signed to the Indianapolis Colts practice squad. He was waived on December 24, 2018.
