= National Italian American Sports Hall of Fame =

Professional sports hall of fame in Chicago, Illinois, U.S.

- Established: 1978
- Location: Temporarily closed
- Type: Hall of fame
- Director: Ron Onesti
- Website: niashf.org

The National Italian American Sports Hall of Fame is a 501(c)(3) nonprofit institution honoring exceptional U.S. athletes of Italian descent. In 1977 George Randazzo created the Italian American Boxing Hall of Fame. This was as a means for raising money for local Catholic youth programs. After a successful year and dinner honoring 23 former Italian American boxing champions, Randazzo created the National Italian American Sports Hall of Fame. The original location was in Elmwood Park, Illinois. The first induction ceremony honored Lou Ambers, Eddie Arcaro, Charley Trippi, Gino Marchetti, Dom DiMaggio, Joe DiMaggio, and Vince Lombardi. Since its founding in 1978, more than 230 Italian Americans have been inducted into this hall of fame.

The Hall of Fame and museum was located in a 44,000-square-foot (4,000 m²) building on Taylor Street in the heart of Chicago's "Little Italy" neighborhood from 2000 until 2019. The Hall of Fame is now based on the city's north side.

== History ==
In 1977, George Randazzo founded the Italian American Boxing Hall of Fame as a way to raise money for a struggling local Catholic youth program. Randazzo collected boxing photos and memorabilia, a hobby that inspired him to organize a fundraising dinner that brought together a list of boxing greats and celebrities. The dinner honored twenty-three former Italian American boxing world champions, including Rocky Graziano, Jake LaMotta, Sammy Angott, Willie Pep, and posthumously Rocky Marciano, Primo Carnera and Tony Canzoneri.

The results were so overwhelming that a friend and local businessman, Don Ponte, encouraged Randazzo to start a Hall of Fame to honor all Italian American athletes. One year later, the National Italian American Sports Hall of Fame was founded as a non-profit, educational institution. The first induction ceremony and banquet was a star-studded event, as the Hall of Fame honored Lou Ambers, Eddie Arcaro, Charlie Trippi, Gino Marchetti, Dom DiMaggio and “The Yankee Clipper,” Joe DiMaggio. Mrs. Vince Lombardi also accepted the posthumous induction of her late husband, Coach Vince Lombardi.

In the years that followed, celebrities from all walks of life have come to the annual induction ceremonies to pay tribute to outstanding Italian American sports champions and heroes. An uninvited guest took part in the 1980 induction ceremony: President Jimmy Carter offered his congratulations and addressed the crowd. In 1988 the Hall of Fame moved its headquarters from Elmwood Park to Arlington Heights.

The NIASHF enjoyed a new beginning in 1998 with the help of Phoenix Suns Chairman/CEO Jerry Colangelo. A 1994 Inductee and Chicago Heights native, Colangelo was asked by Randazzo to serve as Chairman of an ambitious new Hall of Fame building project in the heart of Chicago’s Little Italy. Colangelo accepted, and succeeded in bringing together civic-minded men and women from across the country in support of the project. In 2000 the new facility was dedicated as “The Jerry Colangelo Center,” a tribute to his efforts and leadership. There are over 230 Inductees enshrined in the NIASHF.

== Grand Piazza ==
The Grand Piazza was located on the third floor of the National Italian American Sports Hall of Fame. This banquet and dining area featured an adjacent outdoor terrace and banquet space with a commercial kitchen, an event space used corporate luncheons, dinner meetings, weddings, or any sit-down reception of up to 300 guests. The Rooftop Terrace was located on the fourth floor of the Hall of Fame, and overlooks the city of Chicago.

== See also ==
- List of members of the Italian American Sports Hall of Fame
