= Tim Barnes (American football) =

American football player (born 1988)

No. 61
- Position: Center

Personal information
- Born: May 14, 1988 (age 38); Hughesville, Missouri, U.S.
- Listed height: 6 ft 4 in (1.93 m)
- Listed weight: 297 lb (135 kg)

Career information
- High school: Pettis County Northwest (Hughesville)
- College: Missouri (2006–2010)
- NFL draft: 2011: undrafted

Career history
- Baltimore Ravens (2011)*; St. Louis / Los Angeles Rams (2011–2016); San Francisco 49ers (2017)
- * Offseason or practice squad member only

Awards and highlights
- First-team All-Big 12 (2010)

Career NFL statistics
- Games played: 78
- Games started: 36
- Stats at Pro Football Reference

Tim Barnes (born May 14, 1988) is an American former professional football player who was a center in the National Football League (NFL). He played college football for the Missouri Tigers.

== Early life ==
He attended Pettis County Northwest High school in Hughesville, Missouri where he earned numerous All-State, All-Conference and All-District honors.

== College career ==
He played college football at the University of Missouri. He was selected to the 2007 2nd-Team Academic All-Big 12. He was named 2009 Team Underclassmen Leadership Award. He was a key part of the Missouri Tigers offense that was ranked eighth nationally in total offense (averaging 484.14 yards per game), sixth in the NCAA in scoring offense (42.21 ppg), and fourth in the nation in passing offense (330.36 ypg). The Missouri Tigers offensive line was ranked 16th nationally in fewest quarterback sacks allowed (1.21 per game).

== Professional career ==
=== Pre-draft ===
Barnes was projected to be a seventh round selection in the 2011 NFL draft or high priority undrafted free agent by many analysts. He was ranked the seventh best center out of the 49 centers available by NFLDraftScout.com. He was not invited to the NFL Scouting Combine but did participate at Missouri's Pro Day.

Pre-draft measurables
Height	Weight	40-yard dash	10-yard split	20-yard split	20-yard shuttle	Three-cone drill	Vertical jump	Broad jump	Bench press
6 ft 3 in (1.91 m)	300 lb (136 kg)	5.17 s	1.83 s	3.03 s	4.42 s	7.19 s	31 1/2 in (0.80 m)	8 ft 7 in (2.62 m)	26 reps
All values from Missouri's Pro Day

=== Baltimore Ravens ===
On July 26, 2011, he signed with the Baltimore Ravens as an undrafted free agent. On September 3, 2011, he was released.

=== St. Louis / Los Angeles Rams ===
On September 13, 2011, Barnes signed with the St. Louis Rams to join the practice squad. On January 2, 2012, he re-signed with the team. On August 31, 2012, he was released. On September 2, 2012, he was signed to the practice squad. On September 14, 2012, he was promoted to the active roster from the practice squad. During his first season with the Rams, he was the third center on their depth chart behind Scott Wells and Rob Turner. On September 16, 2012, he made his professional debut in a 31-28 victory over the Washington Redskins. He played in 12 games during his first season with the Rams.

On March 9, 2013, the Rams re-signed him to a one-year, $480,000 contract. Barnes started the 2013 season as the St. Louis Rams backup center to Scott Wells and ahead of rookie Barrett Jones. On December 8, 2013, he made his first career start, in place of an injured Wells, during a 30-10 win over the Arizona Cardinals. He started the last four games.

The St. Louis Rams re-signed Barnes on March 5, 2014, to a one-year, $570,000 contract. He returned in 2014 as the backup center to Wells. He appeared in 14 games during the season.

On March 30, 2015, the St. Louis Rams signed Barnes to a one-year, $710,017 contract with $50,017 guaranteed. Throughout OTA's and training camp, he competed with Barrett Jones and Demetrius Rhaney for the starting center position. After winning the job, he started the season opener and all 16 regular season games.

On March 9, 2016, Barnes re-signed with the Rams on a two-year, $5.60 million contract with $3.25 million guaranteed. He was named the starting center to start the season.

On March 9, 2017, Barnes was released by the Rams.

=== San Francisco 49ers ===
On May 2, 2017, Barnes was signed by the San Francisco 49ers. He was released on September 1, 2017. He was re-signed on November 29, 2017.
