= Dream for an Insomniac =

- Directed by: Tiffanie DeBartolo
- Screenplay by: Tiffanie DeBartolo
- Produced by: Phyllis Housen; John Hackett; Christopher Lloyd; Rita Rokisky
- Starring: Ione Skye; Jennifer Aniston; Mackenzie Astin; Michael Landes; Robert Kelker-Kelly; Seymour Cassel
- Cinematography: Guillermo Navarro
- Distributed by: Cinepix Film Properties
- Release date: 18 April 1996; (U.S.)
- Country: United States
- Language: English

Dream for an Insomniac is a 1996 romantic comedy film written and directed by Tiffanie DeBartolo and starring Ione Skye, Jennifer Aniston, Mackenzie Astin and Michael Landes.

== Plot ==
Frankie works at her uncle Leo's Cafe Blue Eyes in San Francisco (named in honor of family friend Frank Sinatra), and is hoping to meet her ideal lover, ideally one with blue eyes like Sinatra, while going to auditions with her friend Allison. Frankie suffers from insomnia, and has not slept through the night since childhood, when her parents were killed in a car accident. She spends most of her time at night reading. Writer David Shrader, takes a job at the cafe, and Frankie falls in love with him, while he attempts to cure her insomnia, she reads his writings, and the two take turns reciting philosophical quotes and guessing their source. The film is shot in black and white until Frankie sees David, when the film switches to color and David's eyes are revealed as blue. David breaks Frankie's heart when she finds out that he is engaged to a lawyer, Molly, but he eventually chooses Frankie over his fiancé, and visits her in Los Angeles, where she has joined Allison, who is exploring an acting career. The film ends with Frankie falling asleep in David's arms. A subplot has Rob, the gay son of Leo, trying to convince his father he is straight, with the help of Allison "acting" as his girlfriend. After Allison and Frankie leave, Rob comes out of the closet to his father, who in fact had known and accepted that Rob was gay for many years.

== Cast ==
- Ione Skye as Frankie
- Jennifer Aniston as Allison
- Mackenzie Astin as David Shrader
- Michael Landes as Rob
- Seymour Cassel as Uncle Leo
- Sean Blackman as Juice
- Michael Sterk as B.J.
- Leslie Stevens as Molly Monday
- Robert Kelker-Kelly as Trent
- David Rainey as Delivery Man

== Reception ==
The film earned only $26,000 domestically.

On the review aggregator website Rotten Tomatoes, 50% of 12 critics' reviews are positive.

Jennifer Aniston's performance was praised by critics. Jeffrey M. Anderson said, "Aniston is the breeze in this movie. I was amazed that she of all people was the only one who seemed natural. She seemed to be having a good time, and she seemed in the moment". Barbara Shulgasser found her "terribly funny". Carlo Cavagna added that "Jennifer Aniston, who plays Allison, Frankie's best friend, is the most watchable person in this movie. Although she doesn't deviate from the well-established Jennifer Aniston persona, she at least appears to be having fun—teasing Frankie and experimenting with funny accents."
