= Darrell Williams Jr. =

American football player (born 1993)

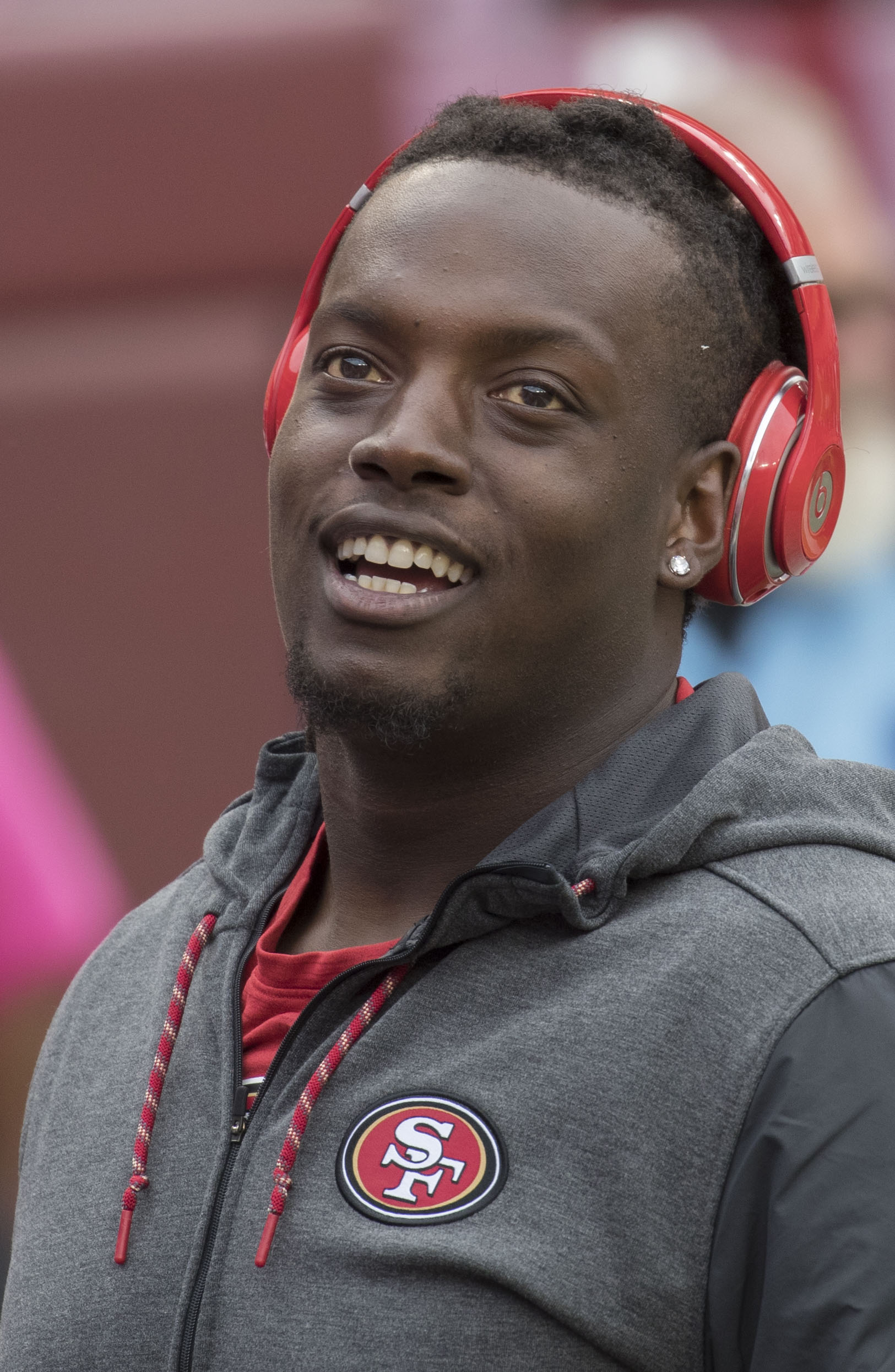
- Williams with the San Francisco 49ers in 2017

No. 78
- Position: Offensive tackle

Personal information
- Born: March 24, 1993 (age 33); Dublin, Georgia, U.S.
- Listed height: 6 ft 5 in (1.96 m)
- Listed weight: 315 lb (143 kg)

Career information
- High school: West Laurens (Dexter, Georgia)
- College: Western Kentucky
- NFL draft: 2017: undrafted

Career history
- San Francisco 49ers (2017); Los Angeles Rams (2018–2019)*; Baltimore Ravens (2019)*; Ottawa Redblacks (2020–2021)*
- * Offseason or practice squad member only

Career NFL statistics
- Games played: 7
- Games started: 0
- Stats at Pro Football Reference

Darrell D. Williams Jr. (born March 24, 1993) is an American former professional football player who was an offensive tackle in the National Football League (NFL). He played college football for the Western Kentucky Hilltoppers.

== Early life ==
Williams attended West Laurens High School in Dexter, Georgia, where he lettered in football and basketball.

== College career ==
Williams played in 46 games for the Western Kentucky Hilltoppers.

== Professional career ==
=== San Francisco 49ers ===
After going undrafted in the 2017 NFL draft, Williams signed with the San Francisco 49ers as an undrafted free agent on May 4, 2017. He was waived by the 49ers on September 2, 2017 and was signed to the practice squad the next day. On November 4, Williams was promoted to the active roster.

On August 31, 2018, Williams was waived by the 49ers.

=== Los Angeles Rams ===
On September 18, 2018, Johnson was signed to the Los Angeles Rams' practice squad. He signed a reserve/future contract with the Rams on February 7, 2019. On May 1, 2019, the Rams waived Williams.

=== Baltimore Ravens ===
On May 6, 2019, Williams signed with the Baltimore Ravens. He was waived during final roster cuts on August 30, 2019.

=== Ottawa Redblacks ===
Williams signed with the Ottawa Redblacks on February 10, 2020. He was released on June 21, 2021.
