= Jed York =

American businessman (born 1980)

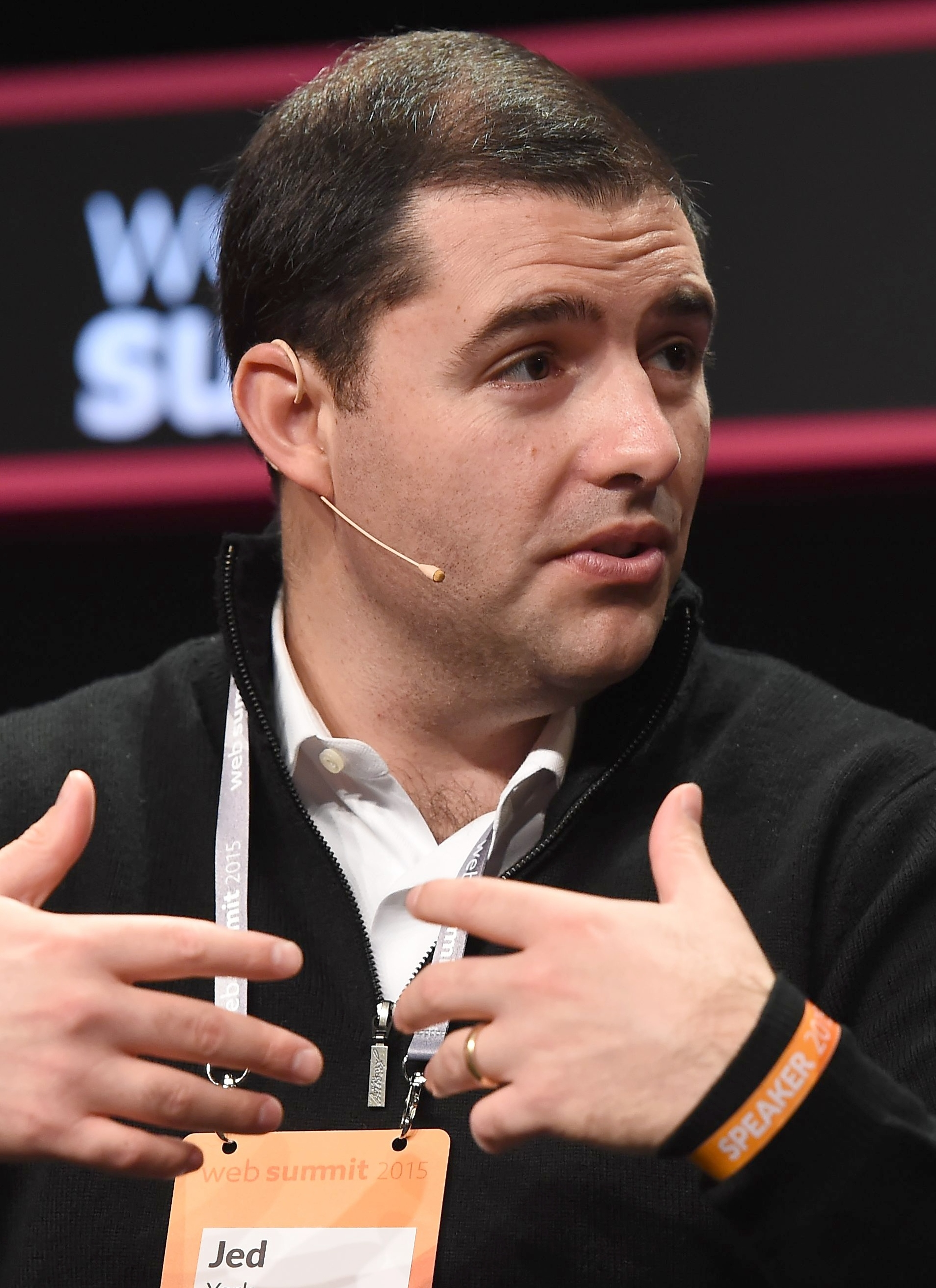
- York in 2015
- Born: John Edward York; March 9, 1980 (age 46); Youngstown, Ohio, U.S.
- Education: University of Notre Dame
- Occupations: Principal owner and CEO, San Francisco 49ers Co-owner, Leeds United F.C. Co-owner, Rangers F.C.
- Parents: John York (father); Denise DeBartolo York (mother)

John Edward "Jed" York (born March 9, 1980) is an American businessman who is the principal owner and chief executive officer of the San Francisco 49ers of the National Football League, as well as co-owner of Premier League club Leeds United and Scottish Premiership club Rangers. He is the son of 49ers co-chairs Denise DeBartolo York and John York, and nephew of former 49ers owner Edward J. DeBartolo Jr. York has been the 49ers' CEO since 2008, and acquired enough of his mother's shares to become the team's principal owner in 2024.

== Early life and education ==
Born and raised in Youngstown, Ohio, York attended St. Charles Elementary School and Cardinal Mooney High School. In high school, he was a baseball team captain and the senior class president. York graduated from the University of Notre Dame with a bachelor's degree in finance and history.

== Career ==
York began work as a financial analyst for Guggenheim Partners at their New York City offices, but left after approximately a year. After that job, York's parents brought him into their family owned team, the San Francisco 49ers, as director of strategic planning and later promoted him to vice president of strategic planning.

In December 2008, York became CEO of the 49ers, with his parents transitioning to the posts of co-chairmen. In making the announcement, his father, John, said that Jed's previous posts served as an opportunity for him to learn how to run a major league franchise. Jed became the operating head of the 49ers, though his parents remained principal owners, and were responsible for providing resources and representing the 49ers at league meetings.

In October 2010, with the 49ers off to an 0–5 start, York wrote to ESPN's Adam Schefter that the 49ers would win their division and make the playoffs. This statement led ESPN columnist David Fleming to refer to York as "kooky" and "goofy" and to note that York "backs up such bold declarations with a long list of qualifications starting with (1) his lifelong love of the 49ers, (2) his prestigious high school baseball career and (3) the fact that his godfather is Eddie DeBartolo." However, the 49ers did come within one game of backing up York's assertion. In 2011, the team finished the season 13–3 with the #2-seed in the National Football Conference. In the Divisional Round, they defeated the New Orleans Saints 36–32. The 49ers then hosted the NFC Championship Game against the New York Giants, where they lost in overtime 20–17. The success of the 2011 San Francisco 49ers was with much of the same team from 2010, but largely accomplished with the key addition of first-year head coach Jim Harbaugh.

In 2012, York was replaced by Gideon Yu as team president, although he retained the title of CEO. During the 2012 season, the 49ers built on their success from 2011, going all the way to Super Bowl XLVII, where they lost to the Baltimore Ravens, who were coached by Harbaugh's brother, John.

In 2013, the 49ers again won 13 games and once again got all the way to the NFC Championship, but lost to the Seattle Seahawks. As it turned out, this would be the last time the 49ers had a winning season, made the playoffs, and reached the NFC Championship Game until the 2019 season.

The 2014 season was different from the 49ers first three seasons under Harbaugh, as the 49ers finished the season with an 8-8 record and missed the playoffs. The season had front office tension between general manager Trent Baalke and Harbaugh. Jay Glazer of Fox Sports said on October 5 that Harbaugh had been informed that he would not return in 2015 regardless of how well the 49ers did, which York denied. After a 19–3 nationally televised loss to the Seattle Seahawks on Thanksgiving, York tweeted: "Thank you 49ers faithful for coming out strong tonight. This performance wasn't acceptable. I apologize for that." This public statement prompted speculation about York's intended meaning. After the season, the 49ers and Harbaugh reportedly agreed to "mutually part ways", something Harbaugh later disputed, with him saying that the 49ers had fired him.

The decision to fire Harbaugh prompted an outcry from the media and the 49ers fan base. In a press conference addressing the issue, York was quoted as saying, "It's up to us to make sure we compete for and win Super Bowls. That's our only goal. We don't raise division championship banners, we don't raise NFC Championship banners. We raise Super Bowl banners. And whenever we don't deliver that, I hope that you will hold me directly responsible and accountable for it. And we look forward to getting this thing back on track." Commenting on York's ability to manage the critical relationship between the general manager and the head coach, Michael Rosenberg wrote in Sports Illustrated, "he failed completely." Rosenberg also described York's impact on the broader 49ers organization, noting that "York has created a culture that encourages selfishness, weakness and back-stabbing." Throughout the season, there were leaks to the media from within the 49ers organization criticizing Harbaugh. San Jose Mercury News columnist Tim Kawakami noted "York and [General Manager, Trent] Baalke were the primary sources for the off-the-record disclosures that undercut Harbaugh's tenure."

Trent Baalke replaced Harbaugh with Jim Tomsula, but York supported the change comparing it to the Golden State Warriors firing Mark Jackson and replacing him with Steve Kerr. Kawakami criticized Jed's comparison in an article titled "49ers' Jed York clueless in comparing Tomsula to Warriors' Kerr." Tomsula lasted one season, leading the 49ers to a 5–11 record before being fired on January 3, 2016. However, according to Adam Gase, it was Baalke and not York who decided to make Tomsula head coach instead of Gase.

In January 2017, York hired John Lynch as general manager and the next month hired Kyle Shanahan as the head coach of the 49ers. In the first eight years after the hires, the 49ers achieved significant success, reaching four NFC Championship games and playing in two Super Bowls.

York has served as chairman of the Silicon Valley Leadership Group's board of directors since 2023.

In March 2024, York announced that he had acquired enough of his mother's equity stake in the 49ers to become the fifth principal owner in franchise history. His uncle bought the team in 1977 from the family of founding owner Tony Morabito, and handed control to York's parents in 2000. York described the decision as a move to prevent the 49ers from being embroiled in the same family conflicts that have roiled other teams owned by a single family. Between them, the DeBartolo-York family owns a commanding 97 percent of the team.

== Soccer investment ==
=== Leeds United F.C. ===
On May 24, 2018, English football club Leeds United announced that 49ers Enterprises had bought shares in the club to become a minority investor. 49ers Enterprises is the business arm of the San Francisco 49ers. In July 2023, it was announced that 49ers Enterprises had purchased the remaining 56 per cent of shares from Andrea Radrizzani.

=== Rangers F.C. ===
On May 30, 2025, it was announced that 49ers Enterprises had purchased a majority stake in Scottish football club Rangers.

== Personal life ==
York is the son of 49ers chairpeople Denise DeBartolo York and John York. He has two sisters. His brother, Tony, died on December 8, 2018, at age 35.

York and his wife, Danielle Belluomini York, have two sons. York filed for divorce from his wife in May 2026.

On August 23, 2026, during a prostitution sting operation, York was arrested in East Palestine, Ohio, on suspicion of engaging in prostitution. The prostitution charges were later lowered to a single charge of disorderly conduct, and York pled no contest to all charges. He was sentenced to one day in jail and ordered to pay a $150 fine for disorderly conduct, along with a $1,000 fine for possessing criminal tools. As an additional consequence, on October 2, 2026, York was suspended by the NFL for six regular-season games and fined $500,000 for violating the NFL's personal conduct policy.
