= John York =

American pathologist and sports team owner (born 1949)

- Born: John C. York; April 18, 1949 (age 77); Muskogee, Oklahoma, U.S.
- Education: University of Notre Dame; Loyola University Chicago
- Occupation: Pathologist
- Known for: Co-chairman, San Francisco 49ers Co-owner and board member, Leeds United F.C.
- Spouse: Denise DeBartolo York
- Children: Jed York

John C. York (born April 18, 1949) is an American retired cancer research pathologist, married to Marie Denise DeBartolo York, and former co-owner and current co-chairman of the San Francisco 49ers. He is a board member of Leeds United.

== Career ==
York was born in Muskogee, Oklahoma. The son of John Clement York, a dentist who died when York was 15, York grew up in Little Rock and attended local schools until college. He graduated from the University of Notre Dame in South Bend, Indiana in 1971. He received a doctorate in blood pathology from Stritch School of Medicine at Loyola University Chicago in 1975, and engaged in seven years of post-doctoral study, specializing in the laboratory diagnosis of lymphoma and leukemia.

York left academia to establish DeYor Laboratories in Boardman, Ohio. In 1993, he sold DeYor Laboratories to Corning Inc. York has made a number of contributions in the medical field, having given a $1.5 million contribution to establish an Endowed Chair in Pathology and an Endowed Chief Residency in Pathology at the University of Arkansas for Medical Sciences. In 1999, he donated a science and math building to Catholic High School for Boys, his alma mater. He also joined Jerry Jones and an anonymous donor in donating $10 million to the school.

On December 28, 2008, John and Denise York announced that their son, Jed York, would become team president and operating head of the franchise, while they would become co-chairpersons responsible for providing resources and maintaining their role of interacting with other owners and NFL executives. John continues to serve as chairman of the NFL's International Committee and also sits on the league's Audit and Business Ventures Committees. In 2024, Denise sold enough equity to her son to make him principal owner in name as well, in order to comply with the NFL regulations on an annual succession plan.

On May 24, 2018, the York family via 49ers Enterprises (the 49ers' business arm) bought shares in English soccer club Leeds United to become a minority investor.
