= Denise DeBartolo York =

American businesswoman and sports team owner (1950)

- Born: Marie Denise DeBartolo; 1950 (age 75–76); Youngstown, Ohio, U.S.
- Education: Saint Mary's College
- Occupation: Businesswoman
- Known for: Owner and co-chair, San Francisco 49ers Owner, Leeds United; Owner, Rangers
- Term: 2000–2008
- Predecessor: Edward J. DeBartolo Jr.
- Successor: Jed York
- Board member of: San Francisco 49ers
- Spouse: John York
- Children: 4, including Jed York
- Parents: Edward J. DeBartolo Sr. (father); Marie Patricia Montani DeBartolo (mother)
- Relatives: Edward J. DeBartolo Jr. (brother); Tiffanie DeBartolo (niece)

Marie Denise DeBartolo York (born 1950) is an American billionaire businesswoman, who is the co-chairwoman of the San Francisco 49ers, as well as the English football team Leeds United and also owner of Scottish football team Rangers F.C. through 49ers Enterprises. She is the daughter of the construction magnate Edward J. DeBartolo Sr. and Marie Patricia Montani DeBartolo.

== Early life ==
DeBartolo grew up in a family famous for real estate development. She graduated from Cardinal Mooney High School in 1968. She attended Saint Mary's College of Indiana, a Catholic women's college near the University of Notre Dame, graduating in 1972.

== Career ==
After graduation, she joined the family business, The DeBartolo Corporation, and became its executive vice president. In 1994, following her father's death, she became company co-chairman and all 78 DeBartolo malls were sold.

In 1978, Edward DeBartolo purchased the National Hockey League's Pittsburgh Penguins. and established DeBartolo York as owner and president. She presided over the Penguins 1990–91 championship season, and was the third woman to serve as president of a Stanley Cup-winning team. In 1991, following the championship, she sold the Penguins to assist the DeBartolo Corporation, which was facing challenges in the aftermath of the real estate collapse of 1987.

Denise became operating head of the 49ers in 1999 after her brother, Eddie Jr., was convicted of failing to tell authorities that former Louisiana governor Edwin Edwards attempted to extort him. Although Eddie could have resumed control of the 49ers after a year, he decided instead to turn his controlling stake in the team over to Denise in return for other portions of the family interests. Despite a years-long perception that the league forced the transaction, Eddie revealed in a 2016 interview that he decided to give the 49ers to his sister and brother-in-law to focus on his family. She and her husband ceded day-to-day control of the 49ers to their son, Jed York in 2008. However, they remained principal owners on paper until 2024, when Denise sold enough equity to her son to make him principal owner in name as well.

On May 24, 2018, the York family, via 49ers Enterprises (the business arm of the San Francisco 49ers), bought shares in English association football club Leeds United to become a minority investor. 49ers Enterprises eventually completed a full takeover of Leeds United on June 9, 2023.

== Personal life ==
She is married to retired American cancer research pathologist John York. The Yorks have four children: sons Jed and Tony (deceased 2018), and daughters Jenna and Mara; and live in Canfield, Ohio, a suburb of Youngstown, Ohio.
