= Kubiak =

Kubiak is a Polish surname. Notable people with the surname include:

- Clifford Kubiak (born 1953), American biochemist
- Dan Kubiak (1938–1998), Texas politician
- Gary Kubiak (born 1961), American football coach
- Jim Kubiak (born 1972), American football coach
- Katie Kubiak (born 2003), American Paralympic swimmer
- Klay Kubiak (born 1988), American football coach
- Klein Kubiak (born 1991), American football executive
- Klint Kubiak (born 1987), American football coach
- Marcin Kubiak (born 1969), Polish diplomat
- Marcin Kubiak (astronomer), Polish astrophysicist
- Michał Kubiak (born 1988), Polish volleyball player
- Ryszard Kubiak (1950–2022), Polish rower
- Ted Kubiak (born 1942), American baseball player
- Teresa Kubiak (born 1937), Polish operatic soprano
- Zygmunt Kubiak (1929–2004), Polish writer

== See also ==
- Jakubiak, similar Polish surname
