= 2023 San Francisco 49ers season =

American football team season

- Owner: Jed York
- General manager: John Lynch
- Head coach: Kyle Shanahan
- Offensive coordinator: Kyle Shanahan (de facto)
- Defensive coordinator: Steve Wilks
- Home stadium: Levi's Stadium

Results
- Record: 12–5
- Division place: 1st NFC West
- Playoffs: Won Divisional Playoffs (vs. Packers) 24–21; Won NFC Championship (vs. Lions) 34–31; Lost Super Bowl LVIII (vs. Chiefs) 22–25 (OT)
- All-Pros: 7: RB Christian McCaffrey (1st team); FB Kyle Juszczyk (1st team); TE George Kittle (1st team); LT Trent Williams (1st team); LB Fred Warner (1st team); WR Brandon Aiyuk (2nd team); CB Charvarius Ward (2nd team)
- Pro Bowlers: 9: Selected but did not play due to participation in Super Bowl LVIII: QB Brock Purdy; RB Christian McCaffrey; TE George Kittle; FB Kyle Juszczyk; T Trent Williams; DE Nick Bosa; DT Javon Hargrave; ILB Fred Warner; CB Charvarius Ward

Uniform
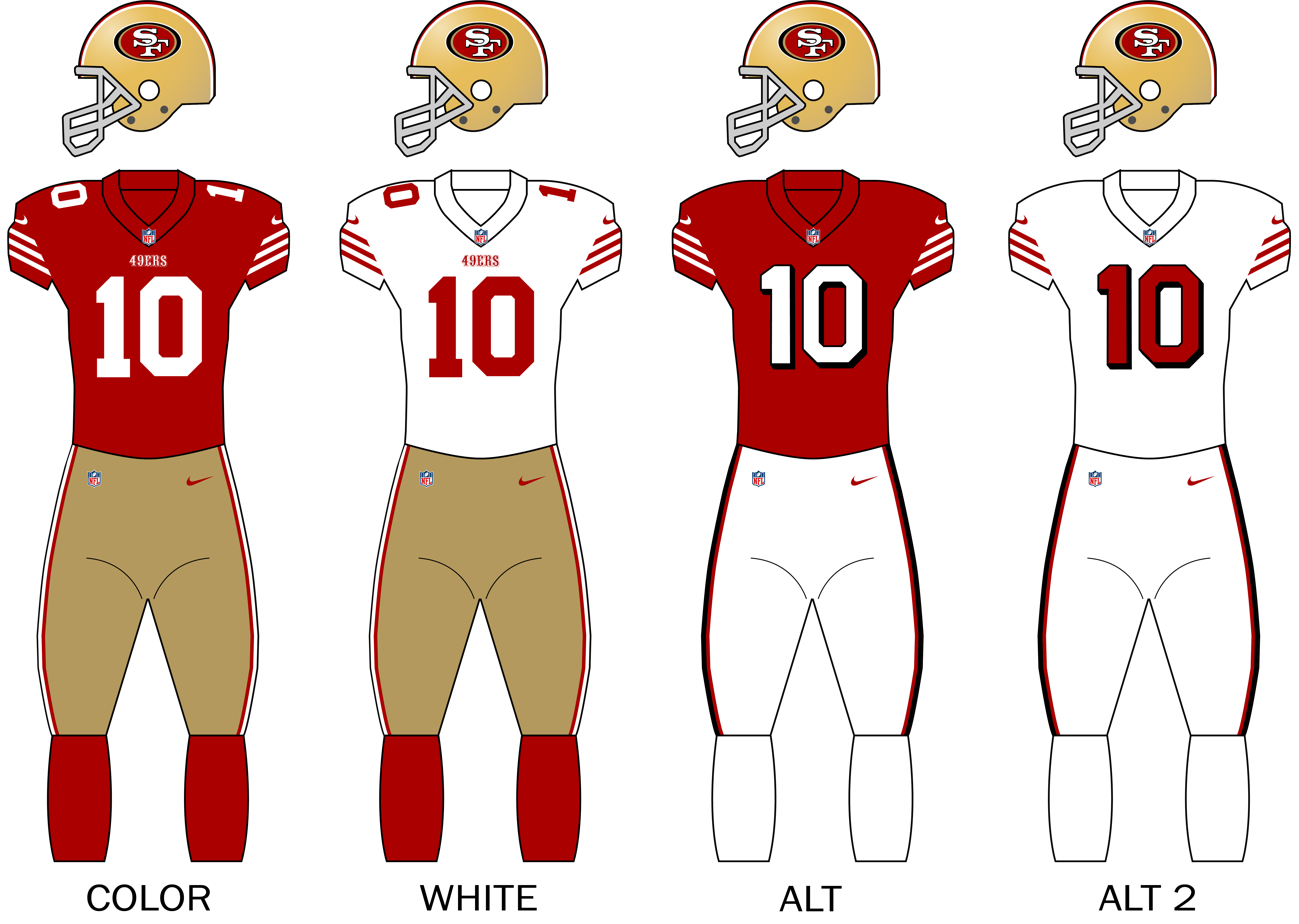

The 2023 season was the San Francisco 49ers' 74th in the National Football League (NFL), their 78th overall, their tenth playing their home games at Levi's Stadium and their seventh under the head coach/general manager tandem of Kyle Shanahan and John Lynch. This was the team's first season since 2013 and 2016, respectively, without safety Jimmie Ward and quarterback Jimmy Garoppolo on the roster; Garoppolo signed with the Las Vegas Raiders on March 17, while Ward signed with the Houston Texans the following day.

The team had a 5–0 start that left them, along with the Philadelphia Eagles, as the last undefeated teams remaining. The 49ers lost to the Cleveland Browns in Week 6, their first of three consecutive losses heading into their bye week. Following the bye, the 49ers won 6 games in a row and, with a week 14 win over the division rival Seattle Seahawks, coupled with the Green Bay Packers' loss to the New York Giants on Monday Night Football, became the first team to clinch a playoff berth in 2023, their fourth in five seasons. The following week the 49ers clinched the NFC West in consecutive seasons for the first time since 2011–2012 with a 45–29 win over the Arizona Cardinals. With a 27–10 Week 17 win over the Washington Commanders, and the Detroit Lions and Philadelphia Eagles losing, the 49ers clinched home-field advantage throughout the NFC playoffs for the first time since 2019. Despite clinching the number one seed, the team failed to match their 13–4 record from the previous year, going 12–5, following their season finale loss to the Los Angeles Rams. After a close 24–21 win in the divisional playoffs against the Green Bay Packers, the 49ers advanced to the NFC Championship Game for the 19th time overall, hosted their record 11th NFC Championship Game, the fourth time in five seasons, the fourth time they had made it in three consecutive seasons, after 1988–1990, 1992–1994, and 2011–2013. In the NFC Championship game against the Detroit Lions, the 49ers came back from a 24–7 halftime deficit to win 34–31, setting an NFL record for overcoming the largest halftime deficit in a championship game. Coincidentally, the 49ers had been the most recent team to overcome a 17-point deficit in a championship game (but which was not a halftime deficit), which happened in 2012 against the Atlanta Falcons. The win allowed the 49ers to make their second Super Bowl appearance in 5 seasons, and their eighth appearance overall. The 49ers faced the Kansas City Chiefs in Super Bowl LVIII, which was a rematch of Super Bowl LIV. However, they were once again defeated by the Chiefs by a final score of 25-22 in overtime, failing to win the Super Bowl for the first time since 1994.

The 49ers finished the season in the top 10 in multiple offensive and defensive categories. On offense, the 49ers finished with 491 points scored, which was third most in the league and the second most points scored in franchise history (behind the 1994 team which scored 505 points). They finished second in the league in total offense with 398.4 yards per game, which included finishing fourth in pass yards per game (257.9) and third in rush yards per game (140.5). They also established an NFL record by becoming the first team in league history to have four players with over 1,000 scrimmage yards, with Deebo Samuel (1,085), George Kittle (1,022), Christian McCaffrey (2,023) and Brandon Aiyuk (1,317) all surpassing the mark. On defense, the 49ers finished third in the league in scoring defense, giving up just 17.5 points per game and finished first in the league with 22 interceptions (tied with the Chicago Bears).

Not only were eight of the 49ers' 12 victories against teams that finished with a winning record, they also defeated every team that made the playoffs in their conference, the first time this has happened since 1993 by the Chiefs. The 49ers defeated the Rams, Cowboys, Buccaneers, and Eagles in the regular season, while defeating the Packers and Lions in the playoffs.

The San Francisco 49ers drew an average home attendance of 71,655 in 8 home games in the 2023 NFL season.

== Offseason ==
=== Roster changes ===
==== Free agency ====
The 49ers entered free agency with the following:

Position	Player	Free agency tag	Date Signed	2023 Team	Notes
FS	Jimmie Ward	UFA	March 18, 2023	Houston Texans	Signed two-year contract
QB	Jimmy Garoppolo	UFA	March 17, 2023	Las Vegas Raiders	Signed three-year contract
DE	Samson Ebukam	UFA	March 17, 2023	Indianapolis Colts	Signed three-year contract
CB	Emmanuel Moseley	UFA	March 16, 2023	Detroit Lions	Signed one-year contract
OT	Mike McGlinchey	UFA	March 15, 2023	Denver Broncos	Signed five-year contract
LB	Azeez Al-Shaair	UFA	March 20, 2023	Tennessee Titans	Signed one-year contract
K	Robbie Gould	UFA			
OT	Daniel Brunskill	UFA	March 20, 2023	Tennessee Titans	Signed two-year contract
DT	Hassan Ridgeway	UFA	March 18, 2023	Houston Texans	Signed one-year contract
DE	Kerry Hyder	UFA	April 17, 2023	San Francisco 49ers	Signed one-year contract
TE	Tyler Kroft	UFA	May 9, 2023	Miami Dolphins	Signed one-year contract
DT	Maurice Hurst Jr.	UFA	March 18, 2023	Cleveland Browns	Signed one-year contract
FS	Tashaun Gipson	UFA	March 15, 2023	San Francisco 49ers	Signed one-year contract
QB	Josh Johnson	UFA	May 22, 2023	Baltimore Ravens	
DE	Jordan Willis	UFA	March 20, 2023	Las Vegas Raiders	Signed one-year contract
LS	Taybor Pepper	UFA	February 28, 2023	San Francisco 49ers	Signed three-year contract
TE	Ross Dwelley	UFA	March 20, 2023	San Francisco 49ers	Signed one-year contract
C	Jake Brendel	UFA	March 15, 2023	San Francisco 49ers	Signed four-year contract
CB	Jason Verrett	UFA			
LB	Demetrius Flannigan-Fowles	RFA	March 16, 2023	San Francisco 49ers	Signed one-year contract
DT	Kevin Givens	RFA	March 13, 2023	San Francisco 49ers	Signed one-year contract
OT	Colton McKivitz	RFA	March 9, 2023	San Francisco 49ers	Signed two-year contract
SS	Tarvarius Moore	UFA	March 17, 2023	Green Bay Packers	Signed one-year contract
DE	Charles Omenihu	UFA	March 16, 2023	Kansas City Chiefs	Signed two-year contract
DT	T. Y. McGill	UFA	March 17, 2023	San Francisco 49ers	Signed one-year contract
WR	Willie Snead	UFA	May 1, 2023	San Francisco 49ers	Signed one-year contract
WR	Jauan Jennings	ERFA	April 17, 2023	San Francisco 49ers	Signed one-year tender
RFA: Restricted free agent, UFA: Unrestricted free agent, ERFA: Exclusive rights free agent LEGEND – Light green background indicates a player has been re-signed by the 49ers. – Light red background indicates a player has departed the 49ers.

==== Signings ====
Position	Player	2022 Team	Date signed	Notes
DT	Javon Hargrave	Philadelphia Eagles	March 16, 2023	Signed four-year contract
QB	Sam Darnold	Carolina Panthers	March 16, 2023	Signed one-year contract
DE	Clelin Ferrell	Las Vegas Raiders	March 16, 2023	Signed one-year contract
CB	Isaiah Oliver	Atlanta Falcons	March 16, 2023	Signed two-year contract
S	Myles Hartsfield	Carolina Panthers	March 20, 2023	Signed one-year contract
C	Jon Feliciano	New York Giants	March 21, 2023	Signed one-year contract
DE	Austin Bryant	Detroit Lions	March 23, 2023	Signed one-year contract
OT	Matt Pryor	Indianapolis Colts	March 27, 2023	Signed one-year contract
WR	Chris Conley	Tennessee Titans	April 17, 2023	Signed one-year contract
QB	Brandon Allen	Cincinnati Bengals	May 8, 2023	Signed one-year contract
DE	Marlon Davidson	Atlanta Falcons	May 8, 2023	Signed one-year contract
TE	Troy Fumagalli		May 8, 2023	Signed one-year contract
LB	Darryl Johnson	Seattle Seahawks	June 6, 2023	Signed one-year contract
CB	Terrance Mitchell	Tennessee Titans	July 25, 2023	Signed one-year contract
LB	Kyahva Tezino		July 27, 2023	Signed one-year contract
DE	Taco Charlton		August 1, 2023	Signed one-year contract
CB	Anthony Averett	Las Vegas Raiders	August 3, 2023	Signed one-year contract
LB	Daelin Hayes	Baltimore Ravens	August 4, 2023	Signed one-year contract
RB	Jeremy McNichols	Pittsburgh Steelers	August 8, 2023	Signed one-year contract
DE	Breeland Speaks		August 11, 2023	Signed one-year contract
CB	Nate Brooks		August 12, 2023	Signed one-year contract
LB	LaDarius Hamilton		August 19, 2023	Signed one-year contract
DT	Tomasi Laulile		August 19, 2023	Signed one-year contract
RB	Brian Hill		August 21, 2023	Signed one-year contract
WR	Anthony Miller		August 22, 2023	Signed one-year contract
DE	Austin Bryant		August 30, 2023	Signed one-year contract
DE	Kerry Hyder Jr.		August 30, 2023	Signed one-year contract
CB	Anthony Brown		September 19, 2023	Signed one-year contract
G	Ben Bartch		November 21, 2023	Signed one-year contract

Indicates that the player was a free agent at the end of his respective team's 2022 season.

==== Departures ====
Position	Player	Date	Notes
WR	Shae Wyatt	June 6, 2023	Waived
S	Avery Young	June 6, 2023	Waived
RB	Ronald Awatt	August 8, 2023	Waived
LB	Daelin Hayes	August 12, 2023	Waived
RB	Khalan Laborn	August 19, 2023	Waived
DT	Tomasi Laulile	August 21, 2023	Waived
WR	Dazz Newsome	August 22, 2023	Waived
QB	Trey Lance	August 26, 2023	Traded
CB	Nate Brooks	August 27, 2023	Waived
LB	LaDarius Hamilton	August 27, 2023	Waived
DE	Breeland Speaks	August 27, 2023	Waived
LB	Kyahva Tezino	August 27, 2023	Waived
DE	Spencer Waege	August 27, 2023	Waived
WR	Chris Conley	August 29, 2023	Released
TE	Troy Fumagalli	August 29, 2023	Released
RB	Brian Hill	August 29, 2023	Released
DE	Kerry Hyder Jr.	August 29, 2023	Released
DT	T. Y. McGill	August 29, 2023	Released
RB	Jeremy McNichols	August 29, 2023	Released
WR	Anthony Miller	August 29, 2023	Released
WR	Willie Snead IV	August 29, 2023	Released
DE	Alex Barrett	August 29, 2023	Waived
FB	Jack Colletto	August 29, 2023	Waived
DE	Marlon Davidson	August 29, 2023	Waived
OT	Joey Fisher	August 29, 2023	Waived
OT	Alfredo Gutiérrez	August 29, 2023	Waived
S	Myles Hartsfield	August 29, 2023	Waived
C	Keith Ismael	August 29, 2023	Waived
CB	D'Shawn Jamison	August 29, 2023	Waived
S	Qwuantrezz Knight	August 29, 2023	Waived
OT	Corey Luciano	August 29, 2023	Waived
OT	Ilm Manning	August 29, 2023	Waived
WR	Tay Martin	August 29, 2023	Waived
LB	Marcelino McCrary-Ball	August 29, 2023	Waived
OG	Jason Poe	August 29, 2023	Waived
LB	Curtis Robinson	August 29, 2023	Waived
CB	Tre Swilling	August 29, 2023	Waived
OT	Leroy Watson	August 29, 2023	Waived
WR	Isaiah Winstead	August 29, 2023	Waived

== Draft ==
2023 San Francisco 49ers draft selections
Round	Selection	Player	Position	College	Notes
1	29	Traded to the Miami Dolphins (Note: The 49ers traded a first-round selection (29th overall), 2022 first- and third-round selections, and a 2021 first-round selection to the Miami Dolphins in exchange for a 2021 first-round selection.)			
2	61	Traded to the Carolina Panthers (Note: The 49ers traded second-, third- and fourth-round selections (61st, 93rd and 132nd overall), and a 2024 fifth-round selection to the Carolina Panthers in exchange for RB Christian McCaffrey.)			
3	87	Ji'Ayir Brown	S	Penn State	From Vikings (Note: The 49ers traded third-, fifth- and seventh-round selections (102nd, 164th and 222nd overall) to the Minnesota Vikings in exchange for a third-round selection (87th overall).)
3	93	Traded to the Carolina Panthers			
3	99	Jake Moody	K	Michigan	2020 Resolution JC-2A selection (Note: The 49ers received a third-round selection (99th overall) as compensation for the Washington Commanders hiring San Francisco's vice president of player personnel Martin Mayhew as general manager.)
3	101	Cameron Latu	TE	Alabama	2020 Resolution JC-2A selection (Note: The 49ers received a third-round selection (101st overall) and a 2022 third-round selection as compensation for the Miami Dolphins hiring San Francisco's offensive coordinator Mike McDaniel as head coach.)
3	102	Traded to the Minnesota Vikings			2020 Resolution JC-2A selection (Note: The 49ers received a third-round selection (102nd overall) and a 2024 third-round selection as compensation for the Tennessee Titans hiring San Francisco's director of player personnel Ran Carthon as general manager.)
4	132	Traded to the Carolina Panthers			
5	155	Darrell Luter Jr.	CB	South Alabama	From Dolphins (Note: The 49ers traded RB Jeff Wilson to the Miami Dolphins in exchange for a fifth-round selection (155th overall).)
5	164	Traded to the Minnesota Vikings			
5	173	Robert Beal Jr.	LB	Georgia	Compensatory selection
6	207	Traded to the Houston Texans (Note: The 49ers traded a sixth-round selection (207th overall) to the Houston Texans in exchange for DE Charles Omenihu.)			
6	216	Dee Winters	LB	TCU	Compensatory selection
7	222	Traded to the Minnesota Vikings			From Broncos (Note: The 49ers traded a 2022 seventh-round selection (250th overall) and LB Jonas Griffith to the Denver Broncos in exchange for a seventh-round selection (222nd overall) and a 2022 sixth-round selection.)
7	247	Brayden Willis	TE	Oklahoma	
7	253	Ronnie Bell	WR	Michigan	Compensatory selection
7	255	Jalen Graham	LB	Purdue	Compensatory selection

2023 San Francisco 49ers undrafted free agents
Name	Position	College	Ref.
Ronald Awatt	RB	UTEP	
Jack Colletto	FB	Oregon State	
Joey Fisher	OT	Shepherd	
D'Shawn Jamison	CB	Texas	
Khalan Laborn	RB	Marshall	
Corey Luciano	OT	Washington	
Ilm Manning	OT	Hawaii	
Mariano Sori-Marin	LB	Minnesota	
Spencer Waege	DE	North Dakota State	
Isaiah Winstead	WR	East Carolina	
Shae Wyatt	WR	Tulane	
Avery Young	S	Rutgers	

Draft trades

== Personnel ==
=== Staff / Coaches ===
2023 San Francisco 49ers staff
Front office: Co-chairmen – John and Denise DeBartolo York; Chief executive officer – Jed York; President – Al Guido; President of football operations/general manager – John Lynch; Assistant general manager – Adam Peters; Executive vice president of football operations – Paraag Marathe; Vice president and senior advisor – Keena Turner; Director of pro personnel – R. J. Gillen; Director of college scouting – Tariq Ahmad; Assistant director of college scouting – Justin Chabot; Vice president of football administration – Brian Hampton; Head coaches: Head coach – Kyle Shanahan; Offensive coaches: Offensive passing game specialist – Klint Kubiak; Quarterbacks – Brian Griese; Assistant quarterbacks – Klay Kubiak; Running backs – Bobby Turner; Wide receivers – Leonard Hankerson; Tight ends – Brian Fleury; Offensive line/run game coordinator – Chris Foerster; Assistant offensive line – James Cregg; Assistant offensive line – Joe Graves; Offensive assists – Miguel Reveles; Offensive quality control – Asauni Rufus; Offensive quality control – Deuce Schwartz	Defensive coaches: Defensive coordinator – Steve Wilks; Defensive line – Kris Kocurek; Assistant defensive line – Darryl Tapp; Linebackers – Johnny Holland; Defensive passing game specialist/nickelbacks – Nick Sorensen; Defensive backs – Daniel Bullocks; Assistant defensive backs – Andrew Hayes-Stoker; Defensive quality control – Cameron Brown; Defensive quality control – Jacob Webster; Special teams coaches: Special teams coordinator – Brian Schneider; Assistant special teams – Matthew Harper; Special teams quality control/game management specialist – August Mangin; Strength and conditioning: Head strength and conditioning – Dustin Perry; Assistant strength and conditioning – Aaron Hill; Assistant strength and conditioning – Greg Segrove; Assistant strength and conditioning – Jordan Nieuwsma

=== Final roster ===
2023 San Francisco 49ers roster
Quarterbacks (QB): 17 Brandon Allen; 14 Sam Darnold; 13 Brock Purdy; Running backs (RB): 44 Kyle Juszczyk FB; 24 Jordan Mason; 23 Christian McCaffrey; 25 Elijah Mitchell; Wide receivers (WR): 11 Brandon Aiyuk; 10 Ronnie Bell; 84 Chris Conley; 15 Jauan Jennings; 3 Ray-Ray McCloud; 19 Deebo Samuel; Tight ends (TE): 85 George Kittle; 9 Brayden Willis; 89 Charlie Woerner	Offensive linemen (OL): 65 Aaron Banks G; 78 Ben Bartch G; 64 Jake Brendel C; 74 Spencer Burford G; 55 Jon Feliciano C; 68 Colton McKivitz T; 76 Jaylon Moore T; 75 Matt Pryor T; 71 Trent Williams T; Defensive linemen (DL): 91 Arik Armstead DT; 51 Robert Beal Jr. DE; 97 Nick Bosa DE; 90 Kevin Givens DT; 98 Javon Hargrave DT; 69 Sebastian Joseph-Day DT; 99 Javon Kinlaw DT; 92 Chase Young DE	Linebackers (LB): 48 Oren Burks OLB; 45 Demetrius Flannigan-Fowles MLB; 50 Jalen Graham OLB; 57 Dre Greenlaw OLB; 5 Randy Gregory OLB; 54 Fred Warner MLB; 53 Dee Winters OLB; Defensive backs (DB): 27 Ji'Ayir Brown FS; 31 Tashaun Gipson FS; 2 Deommodore Lenoir CB; 28 Darrell Luter Jr. CB; 30 George Odum SS; 26 Isaiah Oliver CB; 33 Logan Ryan SS; 20 Ambry Thomas CB; 7 Charvarius Ward CB; 0 Samuel Womack CB; Special teams (ST): 4 Jake Moody K; 46 Taybor Pepper LS; 18 Mitch Wishnowsky P	Practice squad: 58 Alex Barrett DE; 40 Austin Bryant DE; 66 Jesse Davis T; 32 Tyrion Davis-Price RB; 77 Alfredo Gutiérrez T (IPP); 60 Sebastian Gutierrez T; 38 Kemon Hall CB; 35 Erik Harris FS; 41 Tayler Hawkins S (PS/I); 61 Corey Luciano C; 86 Tay Martin WR; 96 T. Y. McGill DT; 43 Terrance Mitchell CB; 67 Sam Okuayinonu DE; 59 Curtis Robinson OLB; 83 Willie Snead WR; 88 Jake Tonges TE; 56 Spencer Waege DE; 22 Jason Verrett CB (PS/I); Reserve: 93 Kalia Davis DT (IR); 82 Ross Dwelley TE (IR); 94 Clelin Ferrell DE (IR); 6 Danny Gray WR (IR); 29 Talanoa Hufanga SS (IR); 95 Drake Jackson DE (IR); 81 Cameron Latu TE (IR); 63 Nick Zakelj G (IR); Rookies in italics

== Preseason ==
Week	Date	Opponent	Result	Record	Venue	Recap
1	August 13	at Las Vegas Raiders	L 7–34	0–1	Allegiant Stadium	Recap
2	August 19	Denver Broncos	W 21–20	1–1	Levi's Stadium	Recap
3	August 25	Los Angeles Chargers	L 12–23	1–2	Levi's Stadium	Recap

== Regular season ==
=== Schedule ===
Week	Date	Opponent	Result	Record	Venue	Recap
1	September 10	at Pittsburgh Steelers	**W** 30–7	1–0	Acrisure Stadium	Recap
2	September 17	at **Los Angeles Rams**	**W** 30–23	2–0	SoFi Stadium	Recap
3	September 21	New York Giants	**W** 30–12	3–0	Levi's Stadium	Recap
4	October 1	**Arizona Cardinals**	**W** 35–16	4–0	Levi's Stadium	Recap
5	October 8	Dallas Cowboys	**W** 42–10	5–0	Levi's Stadium	Recap
6	October 15	at Cleveland Browns	**L** 17–19	5–1	Cleveland Browns Stadium	Recap
7	October 23	at Minnesota Vikings	**L** 17–22	5–2	U.S. Bank Stadium	Recap
8	October 29	Cincinnati Bengals	**L** 17–31	5–3	Levi's Stadium	Recap
9	Bye					
10	November 12	at Jacksonville Jaguars	**W** 34–3	6–3	EverBank Stadium	Recap
11	November 19	Tampa Bay Buccaneers	**W** 27–14	7–3	Levi's Stadium	Recap
12	November 23	at **Seattle Seahawks**	**W** 31–13	8–3	Lumen Field	Recap
13	December 3	at Philadelphia Eagles	**W** 42–19	9–3	Lincoln Financial Field	Recap
14	December 10	**Seattle Seahawks**	**W** 28–16	10–3	Levi's Stadium	Recap
15	December 17	at **Arizona Cardinals**	**W** 45–29	11–3	State Farm Stadium	Recap
16	December 25	Baltimore Ravens	**L** 19–33	11–4	Levi's Stadium	Recap
17	December 31	at Washington Commanders	**W** 27–10	12–4	FedExField	Recap
18	January 7	**Los Angeles Rams**	**L** 20–21	12–5	Levi's Stadium	Recap
Note: Intra-division opponents are in **bold** text.

=== Game summaries ===
==== Week 1: at Pittsburgh Steelers ====
Week 1: San Francisco 49ers at Pittsburgh Steelers – Game summary

Quarter	1	2	3	4	Total
**49ers**	10	10	7	3	**30**
Steelers	0	7	0	0	**7**

at Acrisure Stadium, Pittsburgh, Pennsylvania

- Date: September 10
- Game time: 1:00 p.m. EDT/10:00 a.m. PDT
- Game weather: Cloudy, 72 °F (22 °C)
- Game attendance: 67,679
- Referee: Alex Kemp
- TV announcers (Fox): Joe Davis, Daryl Johnston and Pam Oliver
- Recap, Game Book

Game information

**First quarter**

- SF – Brandon Aiyuk 8-yard pass from Brock Purdy (Jake Moody kick), 9:29. 49ers 7–0. **Drive: 7 plays, 54 yards, 3:46.**
- SF – Jake Moody 41-yard field goal, 4:38. 49ers 10–0. **Drive: 6 plays, 25 yards, 3:22.**

**Second quarter**

- SF – Brandon Aiyuk 19-yard pass from Brock Purdy (Jake Moody kick), 13:30. 49ers 17–0. **Drive: 9 plays, 68 yards, 4:35.**
- SF – Jake Moody 32-yard field goal, 8:22. 49ers 20–0. **Drive: 7 plays, 37 yards, 3:55.**
- PIT – Pat Freiermuth 3-yard pass from Kenny Pickett (Chris Boswell kick), 0:10. 49ers 20–7. **Drive: 12 plays, 95 yards, 1:25.**

**Third quarter**

- SF – Christian McCaffrey 65-yard run (Jake Moody kick), 14:02. 49ers 27–7. **Drive: 2 plays, 75 yards, 0:58.**

**Fourth quarter**

- SF – Jake Moody 40-yard field goal, 5:30. 49ers 30–7. **Drive: 9 plays, 29 yards, 4:38.**

**Top passers**

- SF – Brock Purdy – 19/29, 220 yards, 2 TD
- PIT – Kenny Pickett – 31/46, 232 yards, TD, 2 INT

**Top rushers**

- SF – Christian McCaffrey – 22 rushes, 151 yards, TD
- PIT – Najee Harris – 6 rushes, 31 yards

**Top receivers**

- SF – Brandon Aiyuk – 8 receptions, 129 yards, 2 TD
- PIT – Allen Robinson – 5 receptions, 64 yards

==== Week 2: at Los Angeles Rams ====
Week 2: San Francisco 49ers at Los Angeles Rams – Game summary

Quarter	1	2	3	4	Total
**49ers**	7	10	3	10	**30**
Rams	3	14	0	6	**23**

at SoFi Stadium, Inglewood, California

- Date: September 17
- Game time: 1:05 p.m. PDT
- Game weather: Cloudy, 71 °F (22 °C) (retractable roof open)
- Game attendance: 74,742
- Referee: Brad Allen
- TV announcers (Fox): Kevin Kugler, Mark Sanchez and Laura Okmin
- Recap, Game Book

Game information

**First quarter**

- SF – Christian McCaffrey 14-yard run (Jake Moody kick), 8:25. 49ers 7–0. **Drive: 11 plays, 75 yards, 6:35.**
- LAR – Brett Maher 43-yard field goal, 1:54. 49ers 7–3. **Drive: 11 plays, 50 yards, 6:31.**

**Second quarter**

- SF – Jake Moody 27-yard field goal, 13:32. 49ers 10–3. **Drive: 7 plays, 66 yards, 3:22.**
- LAR – Kyren Williams 6-yard pass from Matthew Stafford (Brett Maher kick), 9:49. Tied 10–10. **Drive: 8 plays, 60 yards, 3:43.**
- LAR – Kyren Williams 4-yard run (Brett Maher kick), 1:45. Rams 17–10. **Drive: 13 plays, 88 yards, 5:17.**
- SF – Brock Purdy 1-yard run (Jake Moody kick), 0:00. Tied 17–17. **Drive: 7 plays, 75 yards, 1:45.**

**Third quarter**

- SF – Jake Moody 57-yard field goal, 1:21. 49ers 20–17. **Drive: 6 plays, 33 yards, 2:49.**

**Fourth quarter**

- SF – Deebo Samuel 11-yard run (Jake Moody kick), 11:28. 49ers 27–17. **Drive: 7 plays, 74 yards, 3:52.**
- LAR – Brett Maher 48-yard field goal, 7:13. 49ers 27–20. **Drive: 14 plays, 45 yards, 4:15.**
- SF – Jake Moody 26-yard field goal, 2:59. 49ers 30–20. **Drive: 4 plays, 7 yards, 1:49.**
- LAR – Brett Maher 38-yard field goal, 0:00. 49ers 30–23. **Drive: 11 plays, 50 yards, 1:34.**

**Top passers**

- SF – Brock Purdy – 17/25, 206 yards
- LAR – Matthew Stafford – 34/55, 307 yards, TD, 2 INT

**Top rushers**

- SF – Christian McCaffrey – 20 rushes, 116 yards, TD
- LAR – Kyren Williams – 14 rushes, 52 yards, TD

**Top receivers**

- SF – Deebo Samuel – 6 receptions, 63 yards
- LAR – Puka Nacua – 15 receptions, 147 yards

==== Week 3: vs. New York Giants ====
Week 3: New York Giants at San Francisco 49ers – Game summary

Quarter	1	2	3	4	Total
Giants	3	3	6	0	**12**
**49ers**	3	14	3	10	**30**

at Levi's Stadium, Santa Clara, California

- Date: September 21
- Game time: 5:15 p.m. PDT
- Game weather: Sunny, 77 °F (25 °C)
- Game attendance: 71,593
- Referee: Shawn Hochuli
- TV announcers (KTVU/Prime Video): Al Michaels, Kirk Herbstreit and Kaylee Hartung
- Recap, Game Book

Game information

**First quarter**

- SF – Jake Moody 28-yard field goal, 8:44. 49ers 3–0. **Drive: 15 plays, 64 yards, 6:16.**
- NYG – Graham Gano 44-yard field goal, 3:18. Tied 3–3. **Drive: 12 plays, 49 yards, 5:26.**

**Second quarter**

- SF – Ronnie Bell 9-yard pass from Brock Purdy (Jake Moody kick), 7:49. 49ers 10–3. **Drive: 11 plays, 62 yards, 6:24.**
- SF – Christian McCaffrey 4-yard run (Jake Moody kick), 1:40. 49ers 17–3. **Drive: 11 plays, 73 yards, 4:33.**
- NYG – Graham Gano 57-yard field goal, 0:13. 49ers 17–6. **Drive: 8 plays, 37 yards, 1:27.**

**Third quarter**

- NYG – Matt Breida 8-yard run (pass failed), 10:00. 49ers 17–12. **Drive: 2 plays, 37 yards, 0:46.**
- SF – Jake Moody 21-yard field goal, 4:08. 49ers 20–12. **Drive: 11 plays, 72 yards, 5:52.**

**Fourth quarter**

- SF – Jake Moody 36-yard field goal, 12:47. 49ers 23–12. **Drive: 8 plays, 51 yards, 4:26.**
- SF – Deebo Samuel 27-yard pass from Brock Purdy (Jake Moody kick), 5:58. 49ers 30–12. **Drive: 8 plays, 70 yards, 5:02.**

**Top passers**

- NYG – Daniel Jones – 22/32, 137 yards, INT
- SF – Brock Purdy – 25/37, 310 yards, 2 TD

**Top rushers**

- NYG – Matt Breida – 4 rushes, 17 yards, TD
- SF – Christian McCaffrey – 18 rushes, 85 yards, TD

**Top receivers**

- NYG – Darius Slayton – 3 receptions, 32 yards
- SF – Deebo Samuel – 6 receptions, 129 yards, TD

==== Week 4: vs. Arizona Cardinals ====
Week 4: Arizona Cardinals at San Francisco 49ers – Game summary

Quarter	1	2	3	4	Total
Cardinals	0	10	6	0	**16**
**49ers**	7	14	0	14	**35**

at Levi's Stadium, Santa Clara, California

- Date: October 1
- Game time: 1:25 p.m. PDT
- Game weather: Sunny, 75 °F (24 °C)
- Game attendance: 71,521
- Referee: Clete Blakeman
- TV announcers (Fox): Kevin Kugler, Mark Sanchez and Laura Okmin
- Recap, Game Book

Game information

**First quarter**

- SF – Christian McCaffrey 1-yard run (Jake Moody kick), 9:07. 49ers 7–0. **Drive: 8 plays, 62 yards, 4:16.**

**Second quarter**

- SF – Christian McCaffrey 18-yard run (Jake Moody kick), 14:14. 49ers 14–0. **Drive: 9 plays, 75 yards, 5:09.**
- ARI – Matt Prater 38-yard field goal, 8:14. 49ers 14–3. **Drive: 13 plays, 40 yards, 6:00.**
- SF – Christian McCaffrey 6-yard pass from Brock Purdy (Jake Moody kick), 5:22. 49ers 21–3. **Drive: 5 plays, 75 yards, 2:52.**
- ARI – Michael Wilson 16-yard pass from Joshua Dobbs (Matt Prater kick), 9:07. 49ers 21–10. **Drive: 13 plays, 87 yards, 4:59.**

**Third quarter**

- ARI – Michael Wilson 8-yard pass from Joshua Dobbs (run failed), 4:12. 49ers 21–16. **Drive: 11 plays, 99 yards, 6:25.**

**Fourth quarter**

- SF – Christian McCaffrey 2-yard run (Jake Moody kick), 14:22. 49ers 28–16. **Drive: 8 plays, 75 yards, 4:50.**
- SF – Brock Purdy 1-yard run (Jake Moody kick), 1:50. 49ers 35–16. **Drive: 14 plays, 77 yards, 7:14.**

**Top passers**

- ARI – Joshua Dobbs – 28/41, 265 yards, 2 TD
- SF – Brock Purdy – 20/21, 283 yards, TD

**Top rushers**

- ARI – James Conner – 11 rushes, 52 yards
- SF – Christian McCaffrey – 20 rushes, 106 yards, 3 TD

**Top receivers**

- ARI – Marquise Brown – 7 receptions, 96 yards
- SF – Brandon Aiyuk – 6 receptions, 148 yards

==== Week 5: vs. Dallas Cowboys ====
Week 5: Dallas Cowboys at San Francisco 49ers – Game summary

Quarter	1	2	3	4	Total
Cowboys	0	7	3	0	**10**
**49ers**	7	14	7	14	**42**

at Levi's Stadium, Santa Clara, California

- Date: October 8
- Game time: 5:20 p.m. PDT
- Game weather: Sunny, 78 °F (26 °C)
- Game attendance: 71,617
- Referee: Alan Eck
- TV announcers (NBC): Mike Tirico, Cris Collinsworth and Melissa Stark
- Recap, Game Book

Game information

**First quarter**

- SF – George Kittle 19-yard pass from Brock Purdy (Jake Moody kick), 11:10. 49ers 7–0. **Drive: 7 plays, 75 yards, 3:50.**

**Second quarter**

- SF – George Kittle 38-yard pass from Brock Purdy (Jake Moody kick), 13:16. 49ers 14–0. **Drive: 1 play, 38 yards, 0:10.**
- DAL – KaVontae Turpin 26-yard pass from Dak Prescott (Brandon Aubrey kick), 7:45. 49ers 14–7. **Drive: 11 plays, 78 yards, 5:31.**
- SF – Christian McCaffrey 1-yard run (Jake Moody kick), 2:36. 49ers 21–7. **Drive: 9 plays, 75 yards, 5:09.**

**Third quarter**

- DAL – Brandon Aubrey 50-yard field goal,11:53. 49ers 21–10. **Drive: 6 plays, 39 yards, 3:07.**
- SF – George Kittle 10-yard pass from Brock Purdy (Jake Moody kick), 7:20. 49ers 28–10. **Drive: 7 plays, 75 yards, 4:33.**

**Fourth quarter**

- SF – Kyle Juszczyk 1-yard pass from Brock Purdy (Jake Moody kick), 14:19. 49ers 35–10. **Drive: 12 plays, 62 yards, 6:42.**
- SF – Jordan Mason 26-yard run (Jake Moody kick), 13:59. 49ers 42–10. **Drive: 1 play, 26 yards, 0:06.**

**Top passers**

- DAL – Dak Prescott – 14/24, 153 yards, TD, 3 INT
- SF – Brock Purdy – 17/24, 252 yards, 4 TD

**Top rushers**

- DAL – Tony Pollard – 8 rushes, 29 yards
- SF – Jordan Mason – 10 rushes, 69 yards, TD

**Top receivers**

- DAL – CeeDee Lamb – 4 receptions, 49 yards
- SF – George Kittle – 3 receptions, 67 yards, 3 TD

==== Week 6: at Cleveland Browns ====
Week 6: San Francisco 49ers at Cleveland Browns – Game summary

Quarter	1	2	3	4	Total
49ers	7	3	0	7	**17**
**Browns**	0	7	6	6	**19**

at Cleveland Browns Stadium, Cleveland, Ohio

- Date: October 15
- Game time: 1:00 p.m. EDT/10:00 a.m. PDT
- Game weather: Cloudy, 53 °F (12 °C)
- Game attendance: 67,431
- Referee: John Hussey
- TV announcers (Fox): Kevin Burkhardt, Greg Olsen, Erin Andrews and Tom Rinaldi
- Recap, Game Book

Game information

**First quarter**

- SF – Christian McCaffrey 13-yard pass from Brock Purdy (Jake Moody kick), 12:16. 49ers 7–0. **Drive: 5 play, 84 yards, 2:44.**

**Second quarter**

- SF – Jake Moody 25-yard field goal, 7:54. 49ers 10–0. **Drive: 11 plays, 76 yards, 6:28.**
- CLE – Kareem Hunt 16-yard run (Dustin Hopkins kick), 5:38. 49ers 10–7. **Drive: 5 plays, 83 yards, 2:16.**

**Third quarter**

- CLE – Dustin Hopkins 42-yard field goal, 11:09. Tied 10–10. **Drive: 9 plays, 48 yards, 3:51.**
- CLE – Dustin Hopkins 46-yard field goal, 2:59. Browns 13–10. **Drive: 6 plays, 18 yards, 2:48.**

**Fourth quarter**

- SF – Jordan Mason 8-yard run (Jake Moody kick), 10:58. 49ers 17–13. **Drive: 1 play, 8 yards, 0:06.**
- CLE – Dustin Hopkins 50-yard field goal, 3:21. 49ers 17–16. **Drive: 14 plays, 43 yards, 7:37.**
- CLE – Dustin Hopkins 29-yard field goal, 1:40. Browns 19–17. **Drive: 9 plays, 63 yards, 1:16.**

**Top passers**

- SF – Brock Purdy – 12/27, 125 yards, TD, INT
- CLE – P. J. Walker – 18/34, 192 yards, 2 INT

**Top rushers**

- SF – Christian McCaffrey – 11 rushes, 43 yards
- CLE – Jerome Ford – 17 rushes, 84 yards

**Top receivers**

- SF – Brandon Aiyuk – 4 receptions, 76 yards
- CLE – Amari Cooper – 4 receptions, 108 yards

==== Week 7: at Minnesota Vikings ====
Week 7: San Francisco 49ers at Minnesota Vikings – Game summary

Quarter	1	2	3	4	Total
49ers	0	7	7	3	**17**
**Vikings**	7	9	6	0	**22**

at U.S. Bank Stadium, Minneapolis, Minnesota

- Date: October 23
- Game time: 7:15 p.m. CDT/5:15 p.m. PDT
- Game weather: None (indoor stadium)
- Game attendance: 66,975
- Referee: Carl Cheffers
- TV announcers (ESPN/ABC): Joe Buck, Troy Aikman and Lisa Salters
- Recap, Game Book

Game information

**First quarter**

- MIN – Jordan Addison 20-yard pass from Kirk Cousins (Greg Joseph kick), 4:48. Vikings 7–0. **Drive: 10 plays, 89 yards, 6:06.**

**Second quarter**

- MIN – Greg Joseph 21-yard field goal, 7:33. Vikings 10–0. **Drive: 13 plays, 67 yards, 7:20.**
- SF – Christian McCaffrey 3-yard run (Jake Moody kick), 1:01. Vikings 10–7. **Drive: 12 plays, 75 yards, 6:32.**
- MIN – Jordan Addison 60-yard pass from Kirk Cousins (kick failed), 0:07. Vikings 16–7. **Drive: 5 plays, 75 yards, 0:54.**

**Third quarter**

- MIN – Greg Joseph 20-yard field goal, 6:59. Vikings 19–7. **Drive: 11 plays, 77 yards, 4:46.**
- SF – Christian McCaffrey 35-yard pass from Brock Purdy (Jake Moody kick), 5:54. Vikings 19–14. **Drive: 3 plays, 75 yards, 1:05.**
- MIN – Greg Joseph 54-yard field goal, 0:20. Vikings 22–14. **Drive: 10 plays, 50 yards, 5:34.**

**Fourth quarter**

- SF – Jake Moody 55-yard field goal, 13:21. Vikings 22–17. **Drive: 6 plays, 31 yards, 1:59.**

**Top passers**

- SF – Brock Purdy – 21/30, 272 yards, TD, 2 INT
- MIN – Kirk Cousins – 35/45, 378 yards, 2 TD, INT

**Top rushers**

- SF – Christian McCaffrey – 15 rushes, 45 yards, TD
- MIN – Alexander Mattison – 8 rushes, 39 yards

**Top receivers**

- SF – George Kittle – 5 receptions, 78 yards
- MIN – Jordan Addison – 7 receptions, 124 yards, 2 TD

==== Week 8: vs. Cincinnati Bengals ====
Week 8: Cincinnati Bengals at San Francisco 49ers – Game summary

Quarter	1	2	3	4	Total
**Bengals**	14	0	3	14	**31**
49ers	7	3	0	7	**17**

at Levi's Stadium, Santa Clara, California

- Date: October 29
- Game time: 1:25 p.m. PDT
- Game weather: Sunny, 74 °F (23 °C)
- Game attendance: 71,655
- Referee: Ronald Torbert
- TV announcers (CBS): Jim Nantz, Tony Romo and Tracy Wolfson
- Recap, Game Book

Game information

**First quarter**

- CIN – Tyler Boyd 7-yard pass from Joe Burrow (Evan McPherson kick), 8:11. Bengals 7–0. **Drive: 10 plays, 85 yards, 4:38.**
- SF – Christian McCaffrey 2-yard run (Jake Moody kick), 3:19. Tied 7–7. **Drive: 8 plays, 75 yards, 4:52.**
- CIN – Andrei Iosivas 2-yard pass from Joe Burrow (Evan McPherson kick), 0:00. Bengals 14–7. **Drive: 6 plays, 58 yards, 3:19.**

**Second quarter**

- SF – Jake Moody 36-yard field goal, 2:44. Bengals 14–10. **Drive: 7 plays, 42 yards, 4:19.**

**Third quarter**

- CIN – Evan McPherson 56-yard field goal, 11:09. Bengals 17–10. **Drive: 7 plays, 37 yards, 3:51.**

**Fourth quarter**

- CIN – Ja'Marr Chase 17-yard pass from Joe Burrow (Evan McPherson kick), 13:04. Bengals 24–10. **Drive: 1 play, 17 yards, 0:04.**
- SF – Christian McCaffrey 4-yard pass from Brock Purdy (Jake Moody kick), 8:12. Bengals 24–17. **Drive: 10 plays, 75 yards, 4:52.**
- CIN – Joe Mixon 5-yard pass run (Evan McPherson kick), 2:54. Bengals 31–17. **Drive: 10 plays, 78 yards, 5:18.**

**Top passers**

- CIN – Joe Burrow – 28/32, 283 yards, 3 TD
- SF – Brock Purdy – 22/31, 365 yards, TD, 2 INT

**Top rushers**

- CIN – Joe Mixon – 16 rushes, 87 yards, TD
- SF – Brock Purdy – 6 rushes, 57 yards

**Top receivers**

- CIN – Ja'Marr Chase – 10 receptions, 100 yards, TD
- SF – George Kittle – 9 receptions, 149 yards

==== Week 10: at Jacksonville Jaguars ====
Week 10: San Francisco 49ers at Jacksonville Jaguars – Game summary

Quarter	1	2	3	4	Total
**49ers**	10	3	14	7	**34**
Jaguars	0	3	0	0	**3**

at EverBank Stadium, Jacksonville, Florida

- Date: November 12
- Game time: 1:00 p.m. EST/10:00 a.m. PST
- Game weather: 59 °F (15 °C)
- Game attendance: 69,271
- Referee: Brad Allen
- TV announcers (Fox): Joe Davis, Daryl Johnston and Pam Oliver
- Recap, Game Book

Game information

**First quarter**

- SF – Brandon Aiyuk 13-yard pass from Brock Purdy (Jake Moody kick), 11:34. 49ers 7–0. **Drive: 4 plays, 57 yards, 2:05.**
- SF – Jake Moody 39-yard field goal, 4:21. 49ers 10–0. **Drive: 10 plays, 41 yards, 4:38.**

**Second quarter**

- JAX – Brandon McManus 37-yard field goal, 4:20. 49ers 10–3. **Drive: 14 plays, 80 yards, 7:36.**
- SF – Jake Moody 35-yard field goal, 0:00. 49ers 13–3. **Drive: 11 plays, 61 yards, 4:20.**

**Third quarter**

- SF – George Kittle 66-yard pass from Brock Purdy (Jake Moody kick), 14:10. 49ers 20–3. **Drive: 2 plays, 75 yards, 0:50.**
- SF – Deebo Samuel 23-yard run (Jake Moody kick), 1:20. 49ers 27–3. **Drive: 7 plays, 81 yards, 3:57.**

**Fourth quarter**

- SF – Kyle Juszczyk 22-yard pass from Brock Purdy (Jake Moody kick), 12:40. 49ers 34–3. **Drive: 3 plays, 40 yards, 1:32.**
- SF – Brock Purdy – 19/26, 296 yards, 3 TD
- JAX – Trevor Lawrence – 17/29, 185 yards, 2 INT

**Top rushers**

- SF – Christian McCaffrey – 16 rushes, 95 yards
- JAX – Travis Etienne – 9 rushes, 35 yards

**Top receivers**

- SF – George Kittle – 3 receptions, 116 yards, TD
- JAX – Christian Kirk – 6 receptions, 104 yards

==== Week 11: vs. Tampa Bay Buccaneers ====
Week 11: Tampa Bay Buccaneers at San Francisco 49ers – Game summary

Quarter	1	2	3	4	Total
Buccaneers	0	7	0	7	**14**
**49ers**	7	6	14	0	**27**

at Levi's Stadium, Santa Clara, California

- Date: November 19
- Game time: 1:05 p.m. PST / 4:05 p.m. EST
- Game weather: Sunny, 65 °F (18 °C)
- Game attendance: 71,607
- Referee: Craig Wrolstad
- TV announcers (Fox): Joe Davis, Daryl Johnston and Pam Oliver
- Recap, Game Book

Game information

**First quarter**

- SF – Christian McCaffrey 4-yard pass from Brock Purdy (Jake Moody kick), 3:55. 49ers 7–0. **Drive: 12 plays, 80 yards, 7:11.**

**Second quarter**

- SF – Jake Moody 37-yard field goal, 7:21. 49ers 10–0. **Drive: 9 plays, 46 yards, 5:36.**
- TB – Mike Evans 1-yard pass from Baker Mayfield (Chase McLaughlin kick), 1:48. 49ers 10–7. **Drive: 10 plays, 75 yards, 5:33.**
- SF – Jake Moody 28-yard field goal, 0:16. 49ers 13–7. **Drive: 8 plays, 61 yards, 1:32.**

**Third quarter**

- SF – Brandon Aiyuk 76-yard pass from Brock Purdy (Jake Moody kick), 10:54. 49ers 20–7. **Drive: 3 plays, 98 yards, 1:34.**
- SF – George Kittle 3-yard pass from Brock Purdy (Jake Moody kick), 1:42. 49ers 27–7. **Drive: 9 plays, 79 yards, 5:18.**

**Fourth quarter**

- TB – Rachaad White 1-yard run (Chase McLaughlin kick), 14:16. 49ers 27–14. **Drive: 5 plays, 75 yards, 2:26.**

**Top passers**

- TB – Baker Mayfield – 29/45, 246 yards, TD, INT
- SF – Brock Purdy – 21/25, 333 yards, 3 TD

**Top rushers**

- TB – Rachaad White – 9 rushes, 30 yards, TD
- SF – Christian McCaffrey – 21 rushes, 78 yards

**Top receivers**

- TB – Cade Otton – 4 receptions, 49 yards
- SF – George Kittle – 8 receptions, 89 yards, TD

==== Week 12: at Seattle Seahawks ====
Thanksgiving Day games

Week 12: San Francisco 49ers at Seattle Seahawks – Game summary

Quarter	1	2	3	4	Total
**49ers**	7	17	0	7	**31**
Seahawks	3	0	10	0	**13**

at Lumen Field, Seattle, Washington

- Date: November 23
- Game time: 5:20 p.m. PST
- Game weather: Mostly sunny, 39 °F (4 °C)
- Game attendance: 68,702
- Referee: Tra Blake
- TV announcers (NBC): Mike Tirico, Cris Collinsworth and Melissa Stark
- Recap, Game Book

Game information

**First quarter**

- SF – Deebo Samuel 2-yard run (Jake Moody kick), 10:01. 49ers 7–0. **Drive: 9 plays, 71 yards, 4:59.**
- SEA – Jason Myers 51-yard field goal, 9:07. 49ers 7–3. **Drive: 4 plays, 1 yard, 0:54.**

**Second quarter**

- SF – Christian McCaffrey 1-yard run (Jake Moody kick), 13:11. 49ers 14–3. **Drive: 9 plays, 45 yards, 4:51.**
- SF – Christian McCaffrey 8-yard run (Jake Moody kick), 5:11. 49ers 21–3. **Drive: 8 plays, 58 yards, 3:59.**
- SF – Jake Moody 32-yard field goal, 0:39. 49ers 24–3. **Drive: 4 plays, 8 yards, 1:08.**

**Third quarter**

- SEA – Jordyn Brooks 12-interception return (Jason Myers kick), 11:23. 49ers 24–10.
- SEA – Jason Myers 30-yard field goal, 3:13. 49ers 24–13. **Drive: 14 plays, 78 yards, 6:28.**

**Fourth quarter**

- SF – Brandon Aiyuk 28-yard pass from Brock Purdy (Jake Moody kick), 7:51. 49ers 31–13. **Drive: 6 plays, 64 yards, 3:31.**

**Top passers**

- SF – Brock Purdy – 21/30, 209 yards, TD, INT
- SEA – Geno Smith – 18/27, 180 yards, INT

**Top rushers**

- SF – Christian McCaffrey – 19 rushes, 114 yards, 2 TD
- SEA – Zach Charbonnet – 14 rushes, 47 yards

**Top receivers**

- SF – Deebo Samuel – 7 receptions, 79 yards
- SEA – Jaxon Smith-Njigba – 2 receptions, 41 yards

==== Week 13: at Philadelphia Eagles ====
Week 13: San Francisco 49ers at Philadelphia Eagles – Game summary

Quarter	1	2	3	4	Total
**49ers**	0	14	14	14	**42**
Eagles	6	0	7	6	**19**

at Lincoln Financial Field, Philadelphia, Pennsylvania

- Date: December 3
- Game time: 4:25 p.m. EST/1:25 p.m. PST
- Game weather: Cloudy, 52 °F (11 °C)
- Game attendance: 69,879
- Referee: Alex Kemp
- TV announcers (Fox): Kevin Burkhardt, Greg Olsen, Erin Andrews and Tom Rinaldi
- Recap, Game Book

Game information

**First quarter**

- PHI – Jake Elliott 26-yard field goal, 9:51. Eagles 3–0. **Drive: 12 plays, 67 yards, 5:09.**
- PHI – Jake Elliott 39-yard field goal, 2:01. Eagles 6–0. **Drive: 12 plays, 53 yards, 6:48.**

**Second quarter**

- SF – Brandon Aiyuk 2-yard pass from Brock Purdy (Jake Moody kick), 7:15. 49ers 7–6. **Drive: 11 plays, 85 yards, 7:01.**
- SF – Christian McCaffrey 2-yard run (Jake Moody kick), 0:38. 49ers 14–6. **Drive: 10 plays, 90 yards, 3:59.**

**Third quarter**

- SF – Deebo Samuel 12-yard run (Jake Moody kick), 11:41. 49ers 21–6. **Drive: 7 plays, 75 yards, 3:19.**
- PHI – Jalen Hurts 1-yard run (Jake Elliott kick), 6:51. 49ers 21–13. **Drive: 10 plays, 58 yards, 4:50.**
- SF – Deebo Samuel 48-yard pass from Brock Purdy (Jake Moody kick), 3:54. 49ers 28–13. **Drive: 5 plays, 77 yards, 2:57.**

**Fourth quarter**

- SF – Jauan Jennings 18-yard pass from Brock Purdy (Jake Moody kick), 10:43. 49ers 35–13. **Drive: 12 plays, 75 yards, 6:41.**
- PHI – DeVonta Smith 2-yard pass from Jalen Hurts (pass failed), 5:33. 49ers 35–19. **Drive: 13 plays, 71 yards, 5:10.**
- SF – Deebo Samuel 46-yard pass from Brock Purdy (Jake Moody kick), 5:19. 49ers 42–19. **Drive: 2 plays, 47 yards, 0:14.**

**Top passers**

- SF – Brock Purdy – 19/27, 314 yards, 4 TD
- PHI – Jalen Hurts – 26/45, 298 yards, TD

**Top rushers**

- SF – Christian McCaffrey – 17 rushes, 93 yards, TD
- PHI – Jalen Hurts – 7 rushes, 20 yards, TD

**Top receivers**

- SF – Deebo Samuel – 4 receptions, 116 yards, 2 TD
- PHI – A. J. Brown – 8 receptions, 114 yards

==== Week 14: vs. Seattle Seahawks ====
Week 14: Seattle Seahawks at San Francisco 49ers – Game summary

Quarter	1	2	3	4	Total
Seahawks	10	0	6	0	**16**
**49ers**	7	7	7	7	**28**

at Levi's Stadium, Santa Clara, California

- Date: December 10
- Game time: 1:05 p.m. PST
- Game weather: Sunny, 63 °F (17 °C)
- Game attendance: 71,816
- Referee: Brad Rogers
- TV announcers (Fox): Kevin Burkhardt, Greg Olsen, Erin Andrews and Tom Rinaldi
- Recap, Game Book

Game information

**First quarter**

- SF – Jordan Mason 3-yard run (Jake Moody kick), 14:03. 49ers 7–0. **Drive: 2 plays, 75 yards, 0:57.**
- SEA – DK Metcalf 31-yard pass from Drew Lock (Jason Myers kick), 9:44. Tied 7–7. **Drive: 8 plays, 75 yards, 4:19.**
- SEA – Jason Myers 40-yard field goal, 0:56. Seahawks 10–7. **Drive: 7 plays, 50 yards, 3:52.**

**Second quarter**

- SF – Deebo Samuel 54-yard pass from Brock Purdy (Jake Moody kick), 8:18. 49ers 14–10. **Drive: 5 plays, 83 yards, 2:54.**

**Third quarter**

- SF – Deebo Samuel 1-yard run (Jake Moody kick), 1:58. 49ers 21–10. **Drive: 7 plays, 75 yards, 4:00.**
- SEA – Colby Parkinson 25-yard pass from Drew Lock (pass failed), 0:24. 49ers 21–16. **Drive: 3 plays, 78 yards, 1:34.**

**Fourth quarter**

- SF – George Kittle 44-yard pass from Brock Purdy (Jake Moody kick), 14:08. 49ers 28–16. **Drive: 3 plays, 75 yards, 1:16.**

**Top passers**

- SEA – Drew Lock – 22/31, 269 yards, 2 TD, 2 INT
- SF – Brock Purdy – 19/27, 368 yards, 2 TD, INT

**Top rushers**

- SEA – Zach Charbonnet – 9 rushes, 44 yards
- SF – Christian McCaffrey – 16 rushes, 145 yards

**Top receivers**

- SEA – Tyler Lockett – 6 receptions, 89 yards
- SF – Deebo Samuel – 7 receptions, 149 yards, TD

==== Week 15: at Arizona Cardinals ====
Week 15: San Francisco 49ers at Arizona Cardinals – Game summary

Quarter	1	2	3	4	Total
**49ers**	14	7	14	10	**45**
Cardinals	7	6	3	13	**29**

at State Farm Stadium, Glendale, Arizona

- Date: December 17
- Game time: 2:05 p.m. MST/1:05 p.m. PST
- Game weather: Sunny, 76 °F (24 °C) (retractable roof open)
- Game attendance: 63,967
- Referee: Scott Novak
- TV announcers (CBS): Ian Eagle, Charles Davis and Evan Washburn
- Recap, Game Book

Game information

**First quarter**

- ARI – James Conner 2-yard run (Matt Prater kick), 10:40. Cardinals 7–0. **Drive: 7 plays, 75 yards, 4:20.**
- SF – Deebo Samuel 12-yard pass from Brock Purdy (Jake Moody kick), 6:33. Tied 7–7. **Drive: 8 plays, 75 yards, 4:07.**
- SF – Charvarius Ward 66-yard interception return (Jake Moody kick), 4:22. 49ers 14–7.

**Second quarter**

- ARI – Matt Prater 58-yard field goal, 14:11. 49ers 14–10. **Drive: 8 plays, 35 yards, 5:11.**
- ARI – Matt Prater 43-yard field goal, 6:14. 49ers 14–13. **Drive: 11 plays, 44 yards, 6:15.**
- SF – Christian McCaffrey 5-yard pass from Brock Purdy (Jake Moody kick), 1:14. 49ers 21–13. **Drive: 10 plays, 75 yards, 5:00.**

**Third quarter**

- SF – Christian McCaffrey 41-yard pass from Brock Purdy (Jake Moody kick), 13:18. 49ers 28–13. **Drive: 4 plays, 75 yards, 1:42.**
- ARI – Matt Prater 28-yard field goal, 4:20. 49ers 28–16. **Drive: 12 plays, 81 yards, 6:18.**
- SF – Christian McCaffrey 1-yard run (Jake Moody kick), 1:08. 49ers 35–16. **Drive: 6 plays, 60 yards, 3:12.**

**Fourth quarter**

- ARI – Emari Demercado 49-yard run (two-point pass failed), 11:30. 49ers 35–22. **Drive: 8 plays, 75 yards, 4:38.**
- SF – Deebo Samuel 19-yard pass from Brock Purdy (Jake Moody kick), 7:09. 49ers 42–22. **Drive: 7 plays, 75 yards, 4:21.**
- SF – Jake Moody 43-yard field goal, 3:09. 49ers 45–22. **Drive: 6 plays, 22 yards, 3:09.**
- ARI – Elijah Higgins 8-yard pass from Kyler Murray (Matt Prater kick), 0:47. 49ers 45–29. **Drive: 12 plays, 75 yards, 2:22.**

**Top passers**

- SF – Brock Purdy – 16/25, 242 yards, 4 TD
- ARI – Kyler Murray – 26/39, 211 yards, TD, 2 INT

**Top rushers**

- SF – Christian McCaffrey – 18 rushes, 115 yards, TD
- ARI – James Connor – 14 rushes, 86 yards, TD

**Top receivers**

- SF – Christian McCaffrey – 5 receptions, 72 yards, 2 TD
- ARI – Trey McBride – 10 receptions, 102 yards

==== Week 16: vs. Baltimore Ravens ====
Christmas Day games

Week 16: Baltimore Ravens at San Francisco 49ers – Game summary

Quarter	1	2	3	4	Total
**Ravens**	3	13	17	0	**33**
49ers	5	7	0	7	**19**

at Levi's Stadium, Santa Clara, California

- Date: December 25
- Game time: 5:15 p.m. PST
- Game weather: Cloudy, 56 °F (13 °C)
- Game attendance: 71,812
- Referee: Bill Vinovich
- TV announcers (ABC): Joe Buck, Troy Aikman and Lisa Salters
- Recap, Game Book

Game information

**First quarter**

- SF – Penalty on Lamar Jackson enforced in end zone for a Safety, 10:24. 49ers 2–0.
- SF – Jake Moody 45-yard field goal, 5:58. 49ers 5–0. **Drive: 10 plays, 52 yards, 4:26.**
- BAL – Justin Tucker 28-yard field goal, 0:57. 49ers 5–3. **Drive: 8 plays, 65 yards, 5:01.**

**Second quarter**

- BAL – Gus Edwards 1-yard run (Justin Tucker kick), 9:35. Ravens 10–5. **Drive: 11 plays, 53 yards, 4:41.**
- BAL – Justin Tucker 41-yard field goal, 7:03. Ravens 13–5. **Drive: 4 plays, 3 yards, 0:51.**
- SF – Christian McCaffrey 9-yard run (Jake Moody kick), 3:23. Ravens 13–12. **Drive: 6 plays, 67 yards, 3:40.**
- BAL – Justin Tucker 28-yard field goal, 0:00. Ravens 16–12. **Drive: 11 plays, 64 yards, 3:23.**

**Third quarter**

- BAL – Nelson Agholor 6-yard pass from Lamar Jackson (Justin Tucker kick), 12:07. Ravens 23–12. **Drive: 3 plays, 44 yards, 1:10.**
- BAL – Zay Flowers 9-yard pass from Lamar Jackson (Justin Tucker kick), 11:49. Ravens 30–12. **Drive: 1 play, 9 yards, 0:03.**
- BAL – Justin Tucker 24-yard field goal, 2:39. Ravens 33–12. **Drive: 11 plays, 89 yards, 6:42.**

**Fourth quarter**

- SF – Ronnie Bell 12-yard pass from Sam Darnold (Jake Moody kick), 6:19. Ravens 33–19. **Drive: 12 plays, 90 yards, 4:05.**

**Top passers**

- BAL – Lamar Jackson – 23/35, 252 yards, 2 TD
- SF – Brock Purdy – 18/32, 255 yards, 4 INT

**Top rushers**

- BAL – Lamar Jackson – 7 rushes, 45 yards
- SF – Christian McCaffrey – 13 rushes, 102 yards, TD

**Top receivers**

- BAL – Zay Flowers – 9 receptions, 72 yards, TD
- SF – George Kittle – 7 receptions, 126 yards

==== Week 17: at Washington Commanders ====
Week 17: San Francisco 49ers at Washington Commanders – Game summary

Quarter	1	2	3	4	Total
**49ers**	10	3	7	7	**27**
Commanders	0	10	0	0	**10**

at FedExField, Landover, Maryland

- Date: December 31
- Game time: 1:00 p.m. EST/10:00 a.m. PST
- Game weather: Cloudy, 48 °F (9 °C)
- Game attendance: 64,424
- Referee: Ronald Torbert
- TV announcers (Fox): Adam Amin, Mark Schlereth and Kristina Pink
- Recap, Game Book

Game information

**First quarter**

- SF — Jake Moody 38-yard field goal, 8:10. 49ers 3-0. **Drive: 12 plays, 50 yards, 6:54.**
- SF — Deebo Samuel 2-yard pass from Brock Purdy (Jake Moody kick), 1:35. 49ers 10-0. **Drive: 9 plays, 63 yards, 5:38.**

**Second quarter**

- WAS — Joey Slye 47-yard field goal, 12:10. 49ers 10-3. **9 plays, 46 yards, 4:26.**
- WAS — Terry McLaurin 3-yard pass from Sam Howell (Joey Slye kick), 4:37. Tied 10-10. **Drive: 9 plays, 79 yards, 5:18.**
- SF — Jake Moody 22-yard field goal, 0:22. 49ers 13-10. **Drive: 10 plays, 71 yards, 4:14.**

**Third quarter**

- SF — Elijah Mitchell 2-yard run (Jake Moody kick), 5:46. 49ers 20-10. **Drive: 12 plays, 68 yards, 7:15.**

**Fourth quarter**

- SF — Brandon Aiyuk 17-yard pass from Brock Purdy (Jake Moody kick), 9:30. 49ers 27-10. **Drive: 10 plays, 95 yards, 5:33.**

**Top passers**

- SF — Brock Purdy — 22/28, 230 yards, 2 TD
- WAS — Sam Howell — 17/28, 169 yards, TD, 2 INT

**Top rushers**

- SF — Elijah Mitchell — 17 rushes, 80 yards, TD
- WAS — Brian Robinson Jr. — 9 rushes, 44 yards

**Top receivers**

- SF — Brandon Aiyuk — 7 receptions, 114 yards, TD
- WAS — Terry McLaurin — 4 receptions, 61 yards, TD

==== Week 18: vs. Los Angeles Rams ====
Week 18: Los Angeles Rams at San Francisco 49ers – Game summary

Quarter	1	2	3	4	Total
**Rams**	7	0	6	8	**21**
49ers	7	13	0	0	**20**

at Levi's Stadium, Santa Clara, California

- Date: January 7
- Game time: 1:25 p.m. PST
- Game weather: Sunny, 52 °F (11 °C)
- Game attendance: 71,624
- Referee: Clay Martin
- TV announcers (Fox): Adam Amin, Mark Schlereth and Kristina Pink
- Recap, Game Book

Game information

**First quarter**

- SF – Elijah Mitchell 1-yard run (Jake Moody kick), 7:27. 49ers 7–0. **Drive: 12 plays, 75 yards, 7:33.**
- LAR – Puka Nacua 19-yard pass from Carson Wentz (Brett Maher kick), 1:53. Tied 7–7. **Drive: 11 plays, 75 yards, 5:34.**

**Second quarter**

- SF – Sam Darnold 1-yard run (Jake Moody kick), 6:59. 49ers 14–7. **Drive: 16 plays, 75 yards, 9:54.**
- SF – Ronnie Bell 5-yard pass from Sam Darnold (kick failed), 0:11. 49ers 20–7. **Drive: 9 plays, 90 yards, 1:27.**

**Third quarter**

- LAR – Tyler Johnson 8-yard pass from Carson Wentz (kick failed), 4:45. 49ers 20–13. **Drive: 17 plays, 75 yards, 10:15.**

**Fourth quarter**

- LAR – Carson Wentz 12-yard run (Carson Wentz–Tutu Atwell pass), 4:56. Rams 21–20. **Drive: 5 plays, 71 yards, 2:53.**

**Top passers**

- LAR – Carson Wentz – 17/24, 163 yards, 2 TD, INT
- SF – Sam Darnold – 16/26, 189 yards, TD

**Top rushers**

- LAR – Carson Wentz – 17 rushes, 56 yards, TD
- SF – Elijah Mitchell – 14 rushes, 52 yards, TD

**Top receivers**

- LAR – Puka Nacua – 4 receptions, 41 yards, TD
- SF – Chris Conley – 3 receptions, 69 yards

=== Standings ===
==== Division ====
NFC West
	W	L	T	PCT	DIV	CONF	PF	PA	STK
^{(1)} San Francisco 49ers	12	5	0	.706	5–1	10–2	491	298	L1
^{(6)} Los Angeles Rams	10	7	0	.588	5–1	8–4	404	377	W4
Seattle Seahawks	9	8	0	.529	2–4	7–5	364	402	W1
Arizona Cardinals	4	13	0	.235	0–6	3–9	330	455	L1

==== Conference ====
NFC
#	Team	Division	W	L	T	PCT	DIV	CONF	SOS	SOV	STK
**Division leaders**
1 (Note: San Francisco finished ahead of Dallas and Detroit based on conference record, claiming the No. 1 seed.)	San Francisco 49ers	West	12	5	0	.706	5–1	10–2	.509	.475	L1
2 (Note: Dallas claimed the No. 2 seed over Detroit based on head-to-head victory.)	Dallas Cowboys	East	12	5	0	.706	5–1	9–3	.446	.392	W2
3	Detroit Lions	North	12	5	0	.706	4–2	8–4	.481	.436	W1
4 (Note: Tampa Bay finished ahead of New Orleans in the NFC South based on common record. (Tampa Bay is 8–4 against Minnesota, Chicago, Detroit, Green Bay, Atlanta, Carolina, Houston, Tennessee, Jacksonville, and Indianapolis, while New Orleans is 6–6 against the same teams.))	Tampa Bay Buccaneers	South	9	8	0	.529	4–2	7–5	.481	.379	W1
**Wild cards**
5	Philadelphia Eagles	East	11	6	0	.647	4–2	7–5	.481	.476	L2
6	Los Angeles Rams	West	10	7	0	.588	5–1	8–4	.529	.453	W4
7 (Note: Green Bay and Seattle finished ahead of New Orleans based on conference record.) (Note: Green Bay finished ahead of Seattle based on strength of victory, claiming the 7th and final playoff spot.)	Green Bay Packers	North	9	8	0	.529	4–2	7–5	.474	.458	W3
**Did not qualify for the postseason**
8	Seattle Seahawks	West	9	8	0	.529	2–4	7–5	.512	.392	W1
9	New Orleans Saints	South	9	8	0	.529	4–2	6–6	.433	.340	W2
10 (Note: Minnesota finished ahead of Atlanta based on head-to-head victory. Division tie break was initially used to eliminate Chicago (see below).) (Note: Minnesota finished ahead of Chicago based on common record. (Minnesota is 5–7 against Tampa Bay, Los Angeles Chargers, Carolina, Kansas City, Green Bay, Atlanta, New Orleans, Denver, Las Vegas, and Detroit, while Chicago is 4–8 against the same teams.))	Minnesota Vikings	North	7	10	0	.412	2–4	6–6	.509	.454	L4
11 (Note: Chicago finished ahead of Atlanta based on head-to-head victory.)	Chicago Bears	North	7	10	0	.412	2–4	6–6	.464	.370	L1
12	Atlanta Falcons	South	7	10	0	.412	3–3	4–8	.429	.462	L2
13	New York Giants	East	6	11	0	.353	3–3	5–7	.512	.353	W1
14 (Note: Washington finished ahead of Arizona based on head-to-head victory.)	Washington Commanders	East	4	13	0	.235	0–6	2–10	.512	.338	L8
15	Arizona Cardinals	West	4	13	0	.235	0–6	3–9	.561	.588	L1
16	Carolina Panthers	South	2	15	0	.118	1–5	1–11	.522	.500	L3
**Tiebreakers** (Note: When breaking ties for three or more teams under the NFL's rules, they are first broken within divisions, then comparing only the highest-ranked remaining team from each division.)

== Postseason ==
=== Schedule ===
Round	Date	Opponent (seed)	Result	Record	Venue	Recap
Wild Card	First-round bye					
Divisional	January 20	Green Bay Packers (7)	W 24–21	1–0	Levi's Stadium	Recap
NFC Championship	January 28	Detroit Lions (3)	W 34–31	2–0	Levi's Stadium	Recap
Super Bowl LVIII	February 11	vs. Kansas City Chiefs (A3)	L 22–25 (OT)	2–1	Allegiant Stadium	Recap

=== Game summaries ===
==== NFC Divisional Playoffs: vs. (7) Green Bay Packers ====
NFC Divisional Playoffs: (7) Green Bay Packers at (1) San Francisco 49ers – Game summary

Quarter	1	2	3	4	Total
Packers	3	3	15	0	21
49ers	0	7	7	10	24

at Levi's Stadium, Santa Clara, California

- Date: January 20, 2024
- Game time: 5:15 p.m. PST
- Game weather: Rain, 57 °F (14 °C)
- Game attendance: 71,824
- Referee: Alex Kemp
- TV announcers (Fox): Kevin Burkhardt, Greg Olsen, Erin Andrews and Tom Rinaldi
- Recap, Game Book

Game information

First quarter

- GB – Anders Carlson 29-yard field goal, 7:22. Packers 3–0. Drive: 14 plays, 58 yards, 7:38.

Second quarter

- SF – George Kittle 30-yard pass from Brock Purdy (Jake Moody kick), 8:42. 49ers 7–3. Drive: 12 plays, 86 yards, 5:48.
- GB – Anders Carlson 29-yard field goal, 4:09. 49ers 7–6. Drive: 10 plays, 64 yards, 4:33.

Third quarter

- GB – Bo Melton 19-yard pass from Jordan Love (Anders Carlson kick), 9:27. Packers 13–7. Drive: 9 plays, 75 yards, 4:01.
- SF – Christian McCaffrey 39-yard run (Jake Moody kick), 7:39. 49ers 14–13. Drive: 4 plays, 75 yards, 1:48.
- GB – Tucker Kraft 2-yard pass from Jordan Love (Aaron Jones pass from Jordan Love), 5:23. Packers 21–14. Drive: 4 plays, 20 yards, 2:16.

Fourth quarter

- SF – Jake Moody 52-yard field goal, 14:56. Packers 21–17. Drive: 7 plays, 14 yards, 2:06.
- SF – Christian McCaffrey 6-yard run (Jake Moody kick), 1:07. 49ers 24–21. Drive: 12 plays, 69 yards, 5:11.

Top passers

- GB – Jordan Love – 21/34, 194 yards, 2 TD, 2 INT
- SF – Brock Purdy – 23/39, 252 yards, TD

Top rushers

- GB – Aaron Jones – 18 rushes, 108 yards
- SF – Christian McCaffrey – 17 rushes, 98 yards, 2 TD

Top receivers

- GB – Romeo Doubs – 4 receptions, 83 yards
- SF – George Kittle – 4 receptions, 81 yards, TD

==== NFC Championship: vs. (3) Detroit Lions ====
NFC Championship: (3) Detroit Lions at (1) San Francisco 49ers – Game summary

Quarter	1	2	3	4	Total
Lions	14	10	0	7	31
49ers	0	7	17	10	34

at Levi's Stadium, Santa Clara, California

- Date: January 28, 2024
- Game time: 3:40 p.m. PST
- Game weather: Cloudy, 69 °F (21 °C)
- Game attendance: 71,824
- Referee: Clete Blakeman
- TV announcers (Fox): Kevin Burkhardt, Greg Olsen, Erin Andrews and Tom Rinaldi
- Recap, Game Book

Game information

First quarter

- DET – Jameson Williams 42-yard run (Michael Badgley kick), 13:18. Lions 7–0. Drive: 4 plays, 75 yards, 1:42.
- DET – David Montgomery 1-yard run (Michael Badgley kick), 2:34. Lions 14–0. Drive: 11 plays, 62 yards, 5:20.

Second quarter

- SF – Christian McCaffrey 2-yard run (Jake Moody kick), 13:49. Lions 14–7. Drive: 8 plays, 75 yards, 3:45.
- DET – Jahmyr Gibbs 15-yard run (Michael Badgley kick), 5:54. Lions 21–7. Drive: 5 plays, 46 yards, 2:43.
- DET – Michael Badgley 21-yard field goal, 0:07. Lions 24–7. Drive: 17 plays, 68 yards, 4:52.

Third quarter

- SF – Jake Moody 43-yard field goal, 11:02. Lions 24–10. Drive: 9 plays, 50 yards, 3:58.
- SF – Brandon Aiyuk 6-yard pass from Brock Purdy (Jake Moody kick), 5:17. Lions 24–17. Drive: 5 plays, 72 yards, 1:41.
- SF – Christian McCaffrey 1-yard run (Jake Moody kick), 3:02. Tied 24–24. Drive: 4 plays, 24 yards, 2:07.

Fourth quarter

- SF – Jake Moody 33-yard field goal, 9:52. 49ers 27–24. Drive: 11 plays, 65 yards, 7:09.
- SF – Elijah Mitchell 3-yard run (Jake Moody kick), 3:02. 49ers 34–24. Drive: 7 plays, 70 yards, 4:30.
- DET – Jameson Williams 3-yard pass from Jared Goff (Michael Badgley kick), 0:56. 49ers 34–31. Drive: 11 plays, 75 yards, 2:06.

Top passers

- DET – Jared Goff – 25/41, 273 yards, TD
- SF – Brock Purdy – 20/31, 267 yards, TD, INT

Top rushers

- DET – David Montgomery – 15 rushes, 93 yards, TD
- SF – Christian McCaffrey – 20 rushes, 90 yards, 2 TD

Top receivers

- DET – Sam LaPorta – 9 receptions, 97 yards
- SF – Deebo Samuel – 8 receptions, 89 yards

==== Super Bowl LVIII: vs. (A3) Kansas City Chiefs ====
Super Bowl LVIII: (N1) San Francisco 49ers vs. (A3) Kansas City Chiefs – Game summary

Quarter	1	2	3	4	OT	Total
49ers	0	10	0	9	3	22
Chiefs	0	3	10	6	6	25

at Allegiant Stadium, Paradise, Nevada

- Date: February 11, 2024
- Game time: 3:30 p.m. PST
- Game weather: None (indoor stadium)
- Game attendance: 61,629
- Referee: Bill Vinovich
- TV announcers (CBS/Nick): Jim Nantz, Tony Romo, Tracy Wolfson, Evan Washburn and Jay Feely
- Recap, Game Book

Game information

First quarter

- No scoring plays.

Second quarter

- SF – Jake Moody 55-yard field goal, 14:48. 49ers 3–0. Drive: 10 plays, 46 yards, 4:05.
- SF – Christian McCaffrey 21-yard pass from Jauan Jennings (Jake Moody kick), 4:23. 49ers 10–0. Drive: 8 plays, 67 yards, 3:26.
- KC – Harrison Butker 28-yard field goal, 0:20. 49ers 10–3. Drive: 13 plays, 65 yards, 4:03.

Third quarter

- KC – Harrison Butker 57-yard field goal, 5:01. 49ers 10–6. Drive: 9 plays, 47 yards, 4:01.
- KC – Marquez Valdes-Scantling 16-yard pass from Patrick Mahomes (Harrison Butker kick), 2:28. Chiefs 13–10. Drive: 1 play, 16 yards, 0:04.

Fourth quarter

- SF – Jauan Jennings 10-yard pass from Brock Purdy (kick blocked), 11:22. 49ers 16–13. Drive: 12 plays, 75 yards, 6:06.
- KC – Harrison Butker 24-yard field goal, 5:46. Tied 16–16. Drive: 12 plays, 69 yards, 5:36.
- SF – Jake Moody 53-yard field goal, 1:53. 49ers 19–16. Drive: 7 plays, 40 yards, 3:53.
- KC – Harrison Butker 29-yard field goal, 0:03. Tied 19–19. Drive: 11 plays, 64 yards, 1:50.

Overtime

- SF – Jake Moody 27-yard field goal, 7:22. 49ers 22–19. Drive: 13 plays, 66 yards, 7:38.
- KC – Mecole Hardman 3-yard pass from Patrick Mahomes, 0:03. Chiefs 25–22. Drive: 13 plays, 75 yards, 7:19.

Top passers

- SF – Brock Purdy – 23/38, 255 yards, TD
- KC – Patrick Mahomes – 34/46, 333 yards, 2 TD, INT

Top rushers

- SF – Christian McCaffrey – 22 rushes, 80 yards
- KC – Patrick Mahomes – 9 rushes, 66 yards

Top receivers

- SF – Christian McCaffrey – 8 receptions, 80 yards, TD
- KC – Travis Kelce – 9 receptions, 93 yards
