= Robert Beal Jr. =

American football player (born 1999)

No. 50 – San Francisco 49ers
- Position: Defensive end
- Roster status: Practice squad

Personal information
- Born: August 18, 1999 (age 27); Detroit, Michigan, U.S.
- Listed height: 6 ft 4 in (1.93 m)
- Listed weight: 264 lb (120 kg)

Career information
- High school: Peachtree Ridge (Suwanee, Georgia)
- College: Georgia (2019–2022)
- NFL draft: 2023: 5th round, 173rd overall pick

Career history
- San Francisco 49ers (2023–2025); Miami Dolphins (2026); San Francisco 49ers (2026–present)*
- * Offseason or practice squad member only

Awards and highlights
- 2× CFP national champion (2021, 2022)

Career NFL statistics as of 2025
- Total tackles: 36
- Sacks: 1
- Stats at Pro Football Reference

Robert Erwin Beal Jr. (born August 18, 1999) is an American professional football defensive end for the San Francisco 49ers of the National Football League (NFL). He played college football for the Georgia Bulldogs.

== Early life ==
Beal grew up in Duluth, Georgia and initially attended Norcross High School. After his sophomore year, he transferred to IMG Academy in Bradenton, Florida. Beal transferred a second time to Peachtree Ridge High School in Suwanee, Georgia after his junior season, citing a desire to move back to his home. He was originally rated a four-star recruit and initially committed to play college football at Notre Dame as a sophomore before decommitting later in the year and re-opening his recruitment. Beal was re-rated a five-star recruit and ultimately committed to play at Georgia.

== College career ==
Beal played in 11 games during his freshman season at Georgia and had 15 tackles with four tackles for loss and one sack. He saw a decrease in playing time as a sophomore and used a redshirt on the season after playing in four games. After the season, Beal entered the NCAA transfer portal, but later withdrew and returned to Georgia. He played in all 15 of the Bulldogs' games and led the team with 6.5 sacks during Georgia's national championship season in 2021. Beal had 26 tackles with three sacks and 20 quarterback pressures as a redshirt senior while Georgia repeated as national champions.

== Professional career ==
Pre-draft measurables
Height	Weight	Arm length	Hand span	Wingspan	40-yard dash	10-yard split	20-yard split	20-yard shuttle	Three-cone drill	Vertical jump	Broad jump	Bench press
6 ft 3 3/4 in (1.92 m)	247 lb (112 kg)	34 5/8 in (0.88 m)	10 1/8 in (0.26 m)	6 ft 10 1/4 in (2.09 m)	4.48 s	1.62 s	2.59 s	4.42 s	7.26 s	31.5 in (0.80 m)	10 ft 3 in (3.12 m)	14 reps
All values from NFL Combine/Pro Day

=== San Francisco 49ers ===
Beal Jr. was selected by the San Francisco 49ers in the fifth round, 173rd overall, of the 2023 NFL draft. He was placed on injured reserve on August 30, 2023. He was activated on November 27. He made his first NFL sack in Week 18 against the Rams. He appeared in four games as a rookie. In the 2024 season, he appeared in 14 games and contributed on defense and special teams.

On September 13, 2025, Beal Jr. was waived by the 49ers. Two days later, he was re-signed to the 49ers' practice squad. On September 24, Beal was promoted to the active roster. On October 11, Beal Jr. was waived and subsequently re-signed to the practice squad three days later. He was promoted back to the active roster on October 22.

=== Miami Dolphins ===
On March 12, 2026, Beal Jr. signed with the Miami Dolphins. On October 30, he was waived.

=== San Francisco 49ers (second stint) ===
On November 3, 2026, Beal Jr. signed with the San Francisco 49ers practice squad.

== NFL career statistics ==
Legend
**Bold**	Career high

=== Regular season ===
Year	Team	Games		Tackles					Interceptions						Fumbles				
Year	Team	GP	GS	Cmb	Solo	Ast	Sck	TFL	Int	Yds	Avg	Lng	TD	PD	FF	Fum	FR	Yds	TD
2023	SF	4	0	5	2	3	1.0	1	0	0	0.0	0	0	0	0	0	0	0	0
2024	SF	14	0	17	11	6	0.0	0	0	0	0.0	0	0	0	0	0	0	0	0
2025	SF	7	0	14	3	11	0.0	0	0	0	0.0	0	0	0	0	0	0	0	0
Career		25	0	36	16	20	1.0	1	0	0	0.0	0	0	0	0	0	0	0	0

=== Postseason ===
Year	Team	Games		Tackles					Interceptions						Fumbles				
Year	Team	GP	GS	Cmb	Solo	Ast	Sck	TFL	Int	Yds	Avg	Lng	TD	PD	FF	Fum	FR	Yds	TD
2023	SF	3	0	0	0	0	0.0	0	0	0	0.0	0	0	0	0	0	0	0	0
2025	SF	1	0	1	0	1	0.0	0	0	0	0.0	0	0	0	0	0	0	0	0
Career		4	0	1	0	1	0.0	0	0	0	0.0	0	0	0	0	0	0	0	0
