= Klein Kubiak =

American football executive (born 1991)

Dallas Cowboys
- Title: National scout and special projects

Personal information
- Born: July 1, 1991 (age 35); Houston, Texas, U.S.
- Listed height: 6 ft 1 in (1.85 m)
- Listed weight: 195 lb (88 kg)

Career information
- Position: Wide receiver
- High school: Strake Jesuit
- College: Rice (2010–2013)

Career history
- Houston Texans (2012) Salary cap intern; Denver Broncos (2014) Personnel intern; Denver Broncos (2015) Personnel assistant; Denver Broncos (2016–2018) Southwest area scout; Dallas Cowboys (2019–2021) Midwest area scout; Dallas Cowboys (2022–present) National scout & special projects

Klein Ashton Kubiak (born July 1, 1991) is an American professional football executive who is a national scout for the Dallas Cowboys of the National Football League (NFL).

== Early life ==
Kubiak was born on July 1, 1991, in Houston, Texas. He attended high school at Strake Jesuit College Preparatory where he played football and baseball. After graduating high school, Kubiak attended Rice where he played wide receiver for four years. During his time at Rice, he primarily served as a holder for future NFL All-Pro kicker Chris Boswell. Prior to his junior year of college, Kubiak served as a salary cap intern for the Houston Texans. The following summer, he took a finance internship with the McNair Group.

== Executive career ==
=== Denver Broncos ===
After graduating from Rice, Kubiak joined the Denver Broncos front office in 2014 as a personnel intern. The following year, he was promoted to personnel assistant. In this role he was tasked with evaluating pro prospects, creating advance scouting reports, and scouting colleges in Colorado and Wyoming. The following year, Kubiak was promoted to serve as the Bronco's southwest area scout, a role he remained in through 2018.

=== Dallas Cowboys ===
In 2019, the Broncos chose to not renew Kubiak's contract leading to him taking a job with the Dallas Cowboys as a midwest area scout. In 2022, Kubiak was promoted to the role of national scout and special projects. In this role, he was charged with evaluating top college prospects every year after their initial evaluation by an area scout.

== Personal life ==
Kubiak is the son of former Houston Texans and Denver Broncos head coach Gary Kubiak. He is the brother of Las Vegas Raiders head coach Klint Kubiak and San Francisco 49ers offensive coordinator Klay Kubiak. His uncle David Pierce is the head baseball coach of the Rice Owls.

Kubiak graduated from Rice in 2013 with a degree in sports management.
