= Corey Luciano =

American football player (born 1998)

Alabama Crimson Tide
- Title: Assistant coach

Personal information
- Born: August 14, 1998 (age 28); Danville, California, U.S.
- Listed height: 6 ft 4 in (1.93 m)
- Listed weight: 307 lb (139 kg)

Career information
- High school: Monte Vista (Danville)
- College: Diablo Valley (2017–2018); Washington (2019–2022)
- NFL draft: 2023: undrafted

Career history

Playing
- San Francisco 49ers (2023); Las Vegas Raiders (2024)*
- * Offseason or practice squad member only

Coaching
- Alabama (2025–present) Offensive Line

Career NFL statistics
- Games played: 2
- Stats at Pro Football Reference

Corey Luciano (born August 14, 1998) is an American college football coach and former professional football center who currently serves as an assistant coach for the Alabama Crimson Tide. He played in the National Football League (NFL) for the San Francisco 49ers, and played college football for the Washington Huskies.

== Early life ==
Luciano was born on August 14, 1998, in Danville, California. He attended Monte Vista High School in Danville and as a senior helped them win the CIF North Coast Division I Championship in 2016 with a 12–1 record. Rated as a two-star recruit by Rivals.com, he opted to pursue college football at the junior college level, with the Diablo Valley Vikings.

== College career ==
As a true freshman at Diablo Valley in 2017, Luciano was named first-team All-Bay 6 League. He committed to the Washington Huskies, but sat out the 2018 season due to injury. He had been ranked as the top junior college offensive guard nationally by ESPN and the 25th-best player overall by Rivals.com. In the 2019 season at Washington, he switched from center to tight end and played the first six games in his new position. In Washington's 2020 season that was shortened to 4 games, he played in all four games at right tackle after another position change. Luciano switched positions again for the third time, this time back to center, and played in all 12 games in 2021. As a senior in 2022, he played and started all 13 games at center and was named honorable mention All-Pac-12 Conference, receiving conference offensive lineman of the week honors after their game against the Oregon Ducks. Voted on by his teammates, he earned the Earle T. Giant Tough Husky Award, awarded to a player in the program who stands out above all others for embodying the traits of toughness and dedication to the team. He finished his collegiate career having played 35 games.

== Professional career ==
Pre-draft measurables
Height	Weight	Arm length	Hand span	40-yard dash	10-yard split	20-yard split	20-yard shuttle	Three-cone drill	Vertical jump	Broad jump	Bench press
6 ft 3 1/4 in (1.91 m)	307 lb (139 kg)	32 3/8 in (0.82 m)	9 3/4 in (0.25 m)	5.36 s	1.87 s	3.08 s	4.50 s	7.70 s	31 in (0.79 m)	8 ft 9 in (2.67 m)	23 reps
All values from Pro Day

=== San Francisco 49ers ===
After going unselected in the 2023 NFL draft, Luciano was signed by the San Francisco 49ers as an undrafted free agent. He was released at the final roster cuts on August 29 and subsequently re-signed to the practice squad He was elevated to the active roster for the team's Week 11 game against the Tampa Bay Buccaneers and made his debut in the 27–14 win, in which he played on five snaps. He was elevated again to the active roster for the team's Week 12 game against the Seattle Seahawks, appearing again on five snaps. He re-signed on February 14, 2024. He was waived on May 14.

=== Las Vegas Raiders ===
Prior to joining the Las Vegas Raiders, Luciano tried out for the New York Jets during their mandatory June minicamp, but ultimately went unsigned. On July 24, Luciano signed with the Las Vegas Raiders. He was waived/injured on August 27, after suffering an ankle injury in the third preseason game. Luciano was waived with an injury settlement on September 2. After his release, Luciano tried out for three teams during the 2024 NFL season but remained unsigned.

== Coaching career ==
Luciano was hired by the University of Alabama as an assistant offensive line coach for the 2025 season.
