= Jakubiak =

Jakubiak is a Polish surname. Notable people with the surname include:

- Alex Jakubiak (born 1996), Scottish footballer
- Bella Jakubiak (born 1983), self-taught Australian chef
- Elżbieta Jakubiak (born 1966), Polish politician
- Marek Jakubiak (born 1959), Polish politician
- Paweł Jakubiak (born 1974), Polish field hockey player
- Sebastian Jakubiak (born 1993), German footballer
