= Tomasi Laulile =

American football player (born 1995)

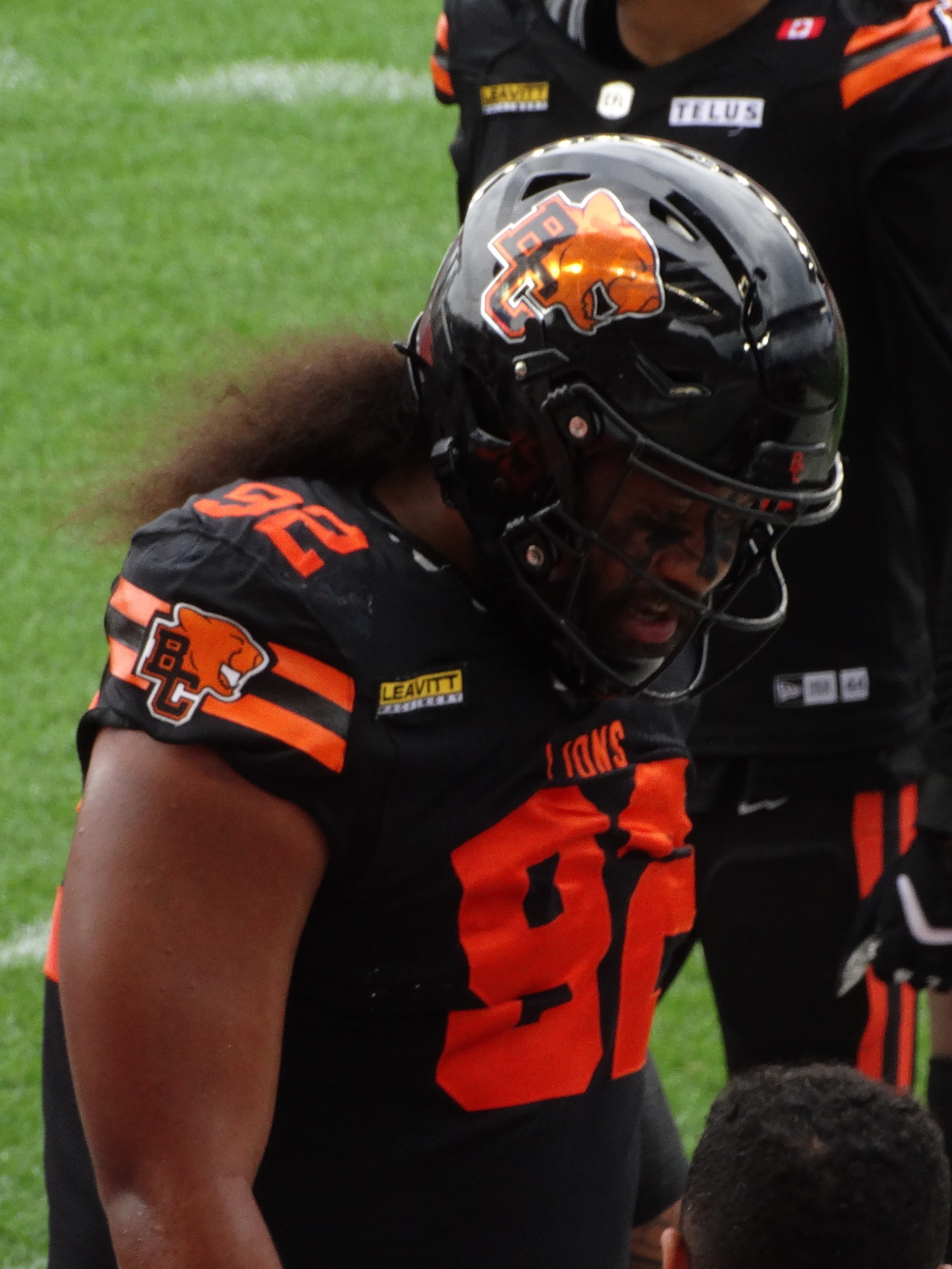
- Laulile with the BC Lions in 2025

No. 95 – BC Lions
- Position: Defensive lineman
- Roster status: Active
- CFL status: American

Personal information
- Born: May 22, 1995 (age 31); Riverside County, California, U.S.
- Listed height: 6 ft 3 in (1.91 m)
- Listed weight: 291 lb (132 kg)

Career information
- High school: Palmdale (Palmdale, California); Westlake (Westlake Village, California)
- College: BYU (2013–2017)
- NFL draft: 2018: undrafted

Career history
- Indianapolis Colts (2018)*; New Orleans Saints (2018–2019)*; Dallas Renegades (2020); TSL Jousters (2021); Houston Gamblers (2022); San Francisco 49ers (2022)*; Arlington Renegades (2023); San Francisco 49ers (2023)*; Denver Broncos (2023)*; Arlington Renegades (2024); BC Lions (2025–2026); Calgary Stampeders (2026)*; BC Lions (2026–present)*
- * Offseason or practice squad member only
- Stats at Pro Football Reference

Tomasi Laulile (born May 22, 1995) is an American professional football defensive lineman for the BC Lions of the Canadian Football League (CFL). He played college football for the BYU Cougars and was signed by the Indianapolis Colts of the National Football League (NFL) as an undrafted free agent in 2018. He has been a member of the Colts, New Orleans Saints, San Francisco 49ers and Denver Broncos in the NFL, the Dallas / Arlington Renegades in the XFL and United Football League (UFL), the Jousters of The Spring League (TSL), and the Houston Gamblers of the United States Football League (USFL).

== Early life ==
Laulile was born on May 22, 1995, in Riverside County, California. The youngest of five children, he attended Palmdale High School in California before transferring to Westlake High School for his senior year. He first played football as a junior while at Palmdale. In 2012, at Westlake, Laulile recorded 52 tackles and 10 sacks while playing as a defensive end, being selected All-Marmonte League and to the Canyon vs. Coast Classic all-star game. He signed to play college football for the BYU Cougars.

== College career ==
Laulile redshirted as a true freshman at BYU in 2013. He was a backup in 2014, appearing in 13 games while totaling seven tackles and an interception. He began seeing more playing time in 2015, making his first start that year while finishing with 26 tackles and three sacks. He played eight games and totaled 13 tackles and three sacks in 2016 before becoming ineligible and missing the 2017 season. He finished his collegiate career with 33 games played and made 47 tackles, 11 tackles-for-loss (TFLs), six sacks and two fumble recoveries.

== Professional career ==
Pre-draft measurables
| Height | Weight | Arm length | Hand span | Wingspan | 40-yard dash | 10-yard split | 20-yard split | 20-yard shuttle | Three-cone drill | Vertical jump | Broad jump | Bench press |
|---|---|---|---|---|---|---|---|---|---|---|---|---|
| 6 ft 2 5/8 in (1.90 m) | 301 lb (137 kg) | 33 5/8 in (0.85 m) | 9 7/8 in (0.25 m) | 6 ft 9 1/8 in (2.06 m) | 4.77 s | 1.69 s | 2.78 s | 4.51 s | 7.21 s | 30.0 in (0.76 m) | 9 ft 1 in (2.77 m) | 21 reps |
All values from Pro Day

=== Indianapolis Colts ===
On May 4, 2018, after going unselected in the 2018 NFL draft, Laulile signed with the Indianapolis Colts as an undrafted free agent. He made three tackles and a sack during preseason but was released by the Colts on September 1, 2018.

=== New Orleans Saints ===
On September 27, 2018, Laulile signed with the practice squad of the New Orleans Saints. On January 21, 2019, Laulile signed a reserve/future contract with the Saints, following the conclusion of the 2018 NFL season, but was ultimately released by the team on May 13, 2019.

=== Dallas Renegades ===
On January 24, 2020, Laulile signed with the Dallas Renegades of the XFL, made the team's final roster, and went on to appear in five games; one as a starter, recording two tackles and one TFL, before the league suspended operations..

=== TSL Jousters ===
In 2021, Laulile played for the Jousters of The Spring League (TSL), helping them reach the Mega Bowl championship game.

=== Houston Gamblers ===
On February 17, 2022, Laulile was selected in the 25th round (204th overall) of the 2022 USFL draft by the Houston Gamblers. He played in all 10 games for the Gamblers, totaling 21 tackles, five TFLs, a half-sack, and a fumble return touchdown. In a game on his 27th birthday, he recorded two fumble recoveries.

=== San Francisco 49ers ===
On July 29, 2022, Laulile returned to the NFL and signed a one-year contract with the San Francisco 49ers, following the conclusion of the 2022 USFL season. On August 15, 2022, Laulile was released by the 49ers, following one preseason game in which he posted a tackle.

=== Arlington Renegades ===
On January 1, 2023, Laulile was selected in the sixth round (46th overall) of the 2023 XFL supplemental draft by the Arlington Renegades. He played in nine games, all as a starter, for the XFL champion Renegades in 2023, making nine tackles and returning an interception for a touchdown. Pro Football Focus (PFF) rated him as one of the top run defenders in the league.

=== San Francisco 49ers (second stint) ===
August 18, 2023, Laulile re-signed with the San Francisco 49ers, following the conclusion of the 2023 XFL season. Laulile appeared in one preseason game for the team, and recorded two tackles. He was released on August 21, 2023.

=== Denver Broncos ===
On August 23, 2023, Laulile signed with the Denver Broncos. He appeared in one preseason game for the team and recorded two tackles, before being released on August 29, 2023.

=== Arlington Renegades (second stint) ===
On the same day as his release from Denver, Laulile re-signed with the Renegades for the 2024 XFL season. He appeared in all 10 games for the team, seven as a starter, recording 14 tackles and 3 TFLs.

=== BC Lions ===
On April 24, 2025, Laulile signed with the BC Lions of the Canadian Football League (CFL). He was released on May 11, 2025.

On May 28, Laulile was re-signed by the Lions and was placed on their one-game injured list to begin the 2025 CFL season. On June 20, Laulile was assigned to the Lions' practice roster. On July 2, he joined the active roster and soon after made his CFL debut in a win against the Montreal Alouettes. On July 26, Laulile was again placed on the Lions' one-game injured list. He re-joined the active roster on August 6. On September 11, Laulile was, for a third time, placed on the Lions' one-game injured list. He re-joined the active roster on September 18. On October 3, Laulile was placed on the Lions' one-game injured list for the fourth time that season. He re-joined the active roster on October 24. On October 31, Laulile was placed on the Lions' one-game injured list for a fifth time, in advance of the Western Semifinal game of the 2025 playoffs and where he remained for the rest of the 2025 postseason.

On May 15, 2026, Laulile was placed on the Lions' 6-game injured list, prior to the start of the 2026 CFL season. He was released on July 29, 2026.

=== Calgary Stampeders ===
On September 16, 2026, Laulile signed with the Calgary Stampeders practice roster. On October 15, he was released.

=== BC Lions (second stint) ===
On October 26, 2026, Laulile signed with the BC Lions and joined their practice roster. On October 30, 2026, Laulile was promoted to the Lions' active roster.
