= Gary Kubiak =

American football player and coach (born 1961)

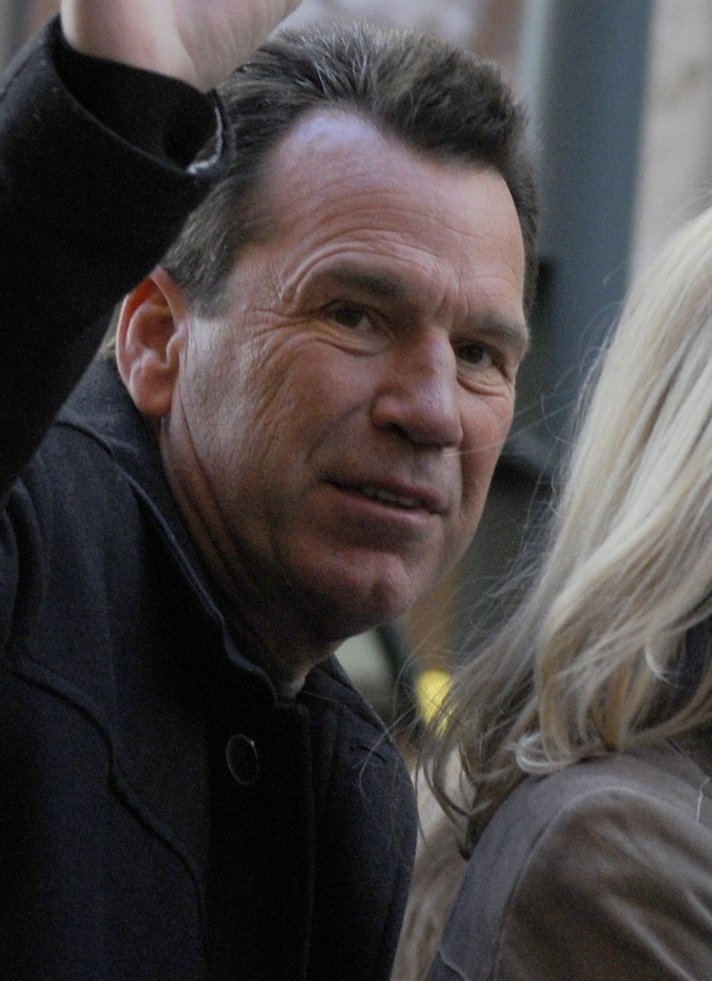
- Kubiak at the Broncos Super Bowl 50 parade, 2016

Profile
- Title: Coaching advisor

Personal information
- Born: August 15, 1961 (age 65); Houston, Texas, U.S.
- Listed height: 6 ft 0 in (1.83 m)
- Listed weight: 192 lb (87 kg)

Career information
- Position: Quarterback (No. 8)
- High school: St. Pius X (Houston)
- College: Texas A&M
- NFL draft: 1983: 8th round, 197th overall pick

Career history

Playing
- Denver Broncos (1983–1991)

Coaching
- Texas A&M (1992–1993) Running backs coach; San Francisco 49ers (1994) Quarterbacks coach; Denver Broncos (1995–2005); Offensive coordinator & quarterbacks coach (1995–2002); Offensive coordinator (2003–2005); Houston Texans (2006–2013) Head coach; Baltimore Ravens (2014) Offensive coordinator; Denver Broncos (2015–2016) Head coach; Minnesota Vikings (2019–2020); Assistant head coach & offensive advisor (2019); Assistant head coach & offensive coordinator (2020)

Operations
- Denver Broncos (2017–2018) Senior personnel advisor; Panthers Wrocław (2022–present) Coaching advisor

Awards and highlights
- As head coach: Super Bowl champion (50); Texans career wins record (63); As assistant coach: 3× Super Bowl champion (XXIX, XXXII, XXXIII)

Career NFL statistics
- Passing attempts: 298
- Passing completions: 173
- Completion percentage: 58.1%
- Passing yards: 1,920
- TD–INT: 14–16
- Passer rating: 70.6
- Stats at Pro Football Reference

Head coaching record
- Regular season: 82–75 (.522)
- Postseason: 5–2 (.714)
- Career: 87–77 (.530)
- Coaching profile at Pro Football Reference

Gary Wayne Kubiak (born August 15, 1961) is an American former professional football player and coach in the National Football League (NFL). He played as a quarterback for the Denver Broncos before transitioning to coaching, eventually serving as head coach for the Houston Texans from 2006 to 2013 and the Broncos from 2015 to 2016, including as the winning head coach of Super Bowl 50 on February 7, 2016, then stepping down from the position on January 1, 2017, citing health reasons.

Kubiak played college football for the Texas A&M Aggies. He was selected in the eighth round of the 1983 NFL draft with the 197th overall pick by Denver, where he played from 1983 to 1991 as the backup to John Elway. Earlier in his coaching career, Kubiak served as an assistant coach for the Broncos, Texas A&M University and San Francisco 49ers. He was also the offensive coordinator for the Baltimore Ravens in 2014. He last served as the assistant head coach and offensive coordinator for the Minnesota Vikings in 2020.

Kubiak has participated in seven Super Bowls, losing three as a player with the Broncos, winning three as an assistant coach with the 49ers and the Broncos, and winning Super Bowl 50 as the head coach of the Broncos.

== Playing career ==
=== High school ===
Kubiak passed for a then state-record 6,190 yards as a quarterback for St. Pius X High School of Houston, Texas, where he was given the nickname "Koob". Twice named to the all-state football, basketball, baseball, and track teams, he was inducted into the Texas High School Football Hall of Fame in 1999. Kubiak graduated from St. Pius X in 1979.

=== College career ===
Kubiak attended Texas A&M University under coaches Tom Wilson and Jackie Sherrill and was selected to the All-Southwest Conference team in 1982 after leading the conference in passing yards (1,948) and touchdowns (19). As a junior, he set a conference record by throwing six touchdown passes against Rice. In four seasons at Texas A&M, he passed for 4,078 yards, 31 touchdowns, and 27 interceptions.

=== NFL career ===
Kubiak was selected in the eighth round with the 197th overall pick of the 1983 NFL draft by the Denver Broncos, the same year quarterback John Elway was drafted with the first overall pick by the Baltimore Colts before forcing a trade to Denver. Kubiak played his entire career for the Broncos as a backup for Elway, a Hall of Famer.

In nine seasons, Kubiak appeared in 119 regular-season games and went 3–2 as a starter. He completed 173-of-298 passes (58.1%) while throwing for 14 touchdowns, 16 interceptions, and 1,920 yards while part of three AFC Championship teams. Kubiak replaced Elway at the end of the Broncos' defeats in Super Bowl XXI and Super Bowl XXIV.

== Coaching career ==
=== Texas A&M (1992–1993) ===
Kubiak began his coaching career at Texas A&M, his alma mater, serving as the running backs coach for two seasons (1992–1993). He worked extensively with All-American running back Greg Hill, who was selected by the Kansas City Chiefs in the first round of the 1994 NFL draft.

=== San Francisco 49ers (1994) ===
Kubiak won his first Super Bowl serving as the quarterbacks coach for the San Francisco 49ers in 1994, guiding Hall of Fame quarterback Steve Young to one of his best seasons. Young received his second NFL MVP and captured Super Bowl XXIX MVP honors by throwing a Super Bowl-record six touchdowns in San Francisco's 49–26 win over the San Diego Chargers.

=== Denver Broncos (1995–2005) ===
Kubiak went to the Broncos the following season when Mike Shanahan, who was previously the 49ers offensive coordinator, became Denver's head coach. In 11 seasons (1995–2005) as the team's offensive coordinator and quarterbacks coach, Kubiak helped lead Denver to two Super Bowl titles (1997, 1998), which were also the final two seasons of John Elway's playing career.

In Kubiak's 11 seasons with the team, the Broncos amassed 66,501 total yards and 465 touchdowns, the most in the NFL during that span. He coached 14 different Pro Bowl Broncos, including running back Terrell Davis, who was named the NFL MVP in 1998.

=== Houston Texans (2006–2013) ===
==== Early years: 2006–2010 ====
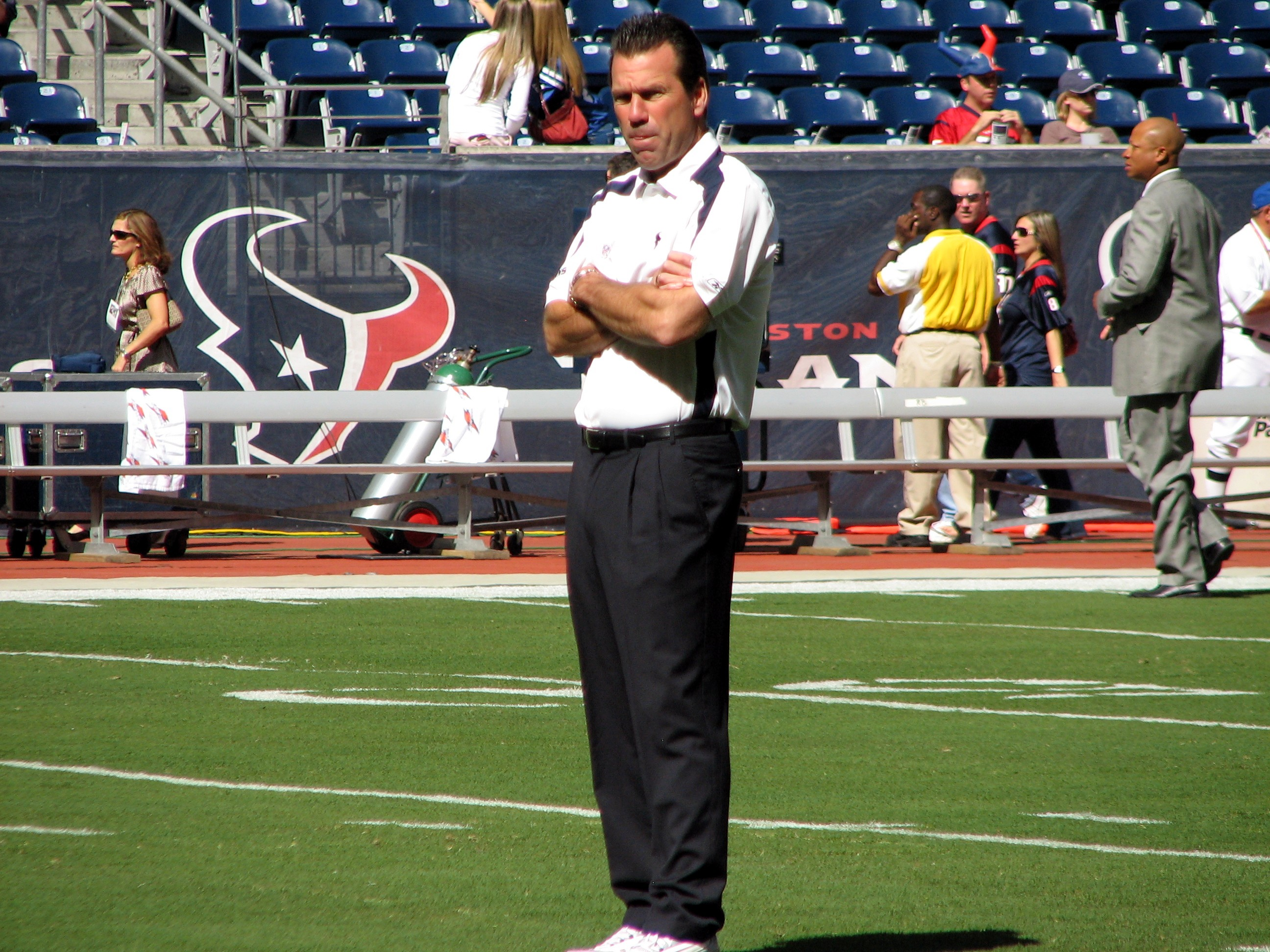
Kubiak coaching the Texans in 2008

Kubiak was named the second head coach in Houston Texans history on January 26, 2006, replacing the fired Dom Capers. In his first season with the team, Houston finished fourth in the AFC South with a 6–10 record. The Texans ended the 2007 season at 8–8, a non-losing record for the first time in team history. The Texans had their second non-losing season, again finishing 8–8, in the 2008 season.

The following season under Kubiak, the Texans achieved their first winning season in franchise history when they overcame a 14-point fourth-quarter deficit to defeat the New England Patriots 34–27 at Reliant Stadium, finishing the 2009 season 9–7. They missed the playoffs on a tiebreaker with the New York Jets. On February 2, 2010, with a year left on the original deal he signed, the Texans signed Kubiak to a three-year contract extension through 2012.

In the 2010 season, Houston started off strong with a record of 4–2 heading into their bye week (Week 7). However, Kubiak's promising campaign quickly turned disastrous as the Texans lost eight of their final 10 games, placing them third in the AFC South, with a record of 6–10. The Texans ended up fourth in passing yards, seventh in rushing yards, and third in overall yards. But the 2010 Texans defense was arguably one of the worst in the league, finishing last in passing yards allowed and tied for last in passing touchdowns allowed.

==== Playoff breakthroughs: 2011–2012 ====
The Texans responded to the 2010 poor defensive showing by firing defensive coordinator Frank Bush, secondary coach David Gibbs, linebackers coach Johnny Holland, and assistant linebackers coach Robert Saleh. Kubiak, a ball boy for beloved former Houston Oilers head coach O.A. "Bum" Phillips in the 1970s, hired long-time friend, and Bum's son, Wade Phillips to take over as the Texans' new defensive coordinator on January 5, 2011. Phillips became available after being fired as head coach of the Dallas Cowboys halfway through the 2010 season. Phillips was allowed to bring in his own assistant coaches. The Texans signed two high-profile free agent defensive backs, Johnathan Joseph and Danieal Manning, and used their first five draft picks, including two in the second round of the 2011 NFL draft, on more defensive players.

The 2011 NFL lockout limited the time coaches had with players in the preseason, but Phillips turned the defense he took over from 30th overall in 2010 to second overall in 2011. Despite debilitating injuries to elite players including wide receiver Andre Johnson and NFL top running back Arian Foster, as well as the devastating November 13, 2011, loss of quarterback Matt Schaub, who was having a solid year, for the season, the Texans secured their first AFC South Championship and first appearance in the NFL playoffs. The Texans, with rookie fifth-round selection T. J. Yates at quarterback, defeated the Cincinnati Bengals by a score of 31–10 on January 7, 2012, in the first playoff game in franchise history, with a record crowd of 71,725 at Reliant Stadium.

Kubiak was named the AFC Coach of the Year by NFL 101 after leading the Texans to a 10–6 regular season record and the franchise's first division crown, playoff berth and playoff win in 2011. Texans owner Bob McNair rewarded Kubiak with a new three-year contract on June 14, 2012. Kubiak turned down a four-year deal for one that expired after the 2014 season.

The 2012 season saw the Texans start 5–0 for the first time in the franchise's history. The Texans finished the season a franchise-best 12–4 and defeated the Cincinnati Bengals in the Wild Card Round for the second straight year before falling to the New England Patriots by a score of 41–28 in the Divisional Round.

==== Health scare and dismissal: 2013 ====
On November 3, 2013, Kubiak collapsed as he was walking off the field at halftime of the game against the Indianapolis Colts. He was put on a backboard and stretcher and transported to the hospital as a precautionary measure. Initial reports stated that he had not had a heart attack. An NFL report on Monday, November 4, 2013, indicated that he had suffered a transient ischemic attack (TIA), or relatively brief, non-permanent symptoms of disorientation, confusion, dizziness, forgetfulness, and/or vertigo (among many other possibilities), that occurs when a blood vessel or vessels in part(s) of the brain are temporarily but not permanently blocked, usually by a stationary clot (a thrombus) or one that has broken off and traveled to occlude another area (an embolus). Especially if they are not properly treated in a timely manner the way Kubiak's was, they can mean that a more permanent stroke (or cerebrovascular accident, CVA) can and likely will eventually happen. In Kubiak's absence for the second half between the Colts, defensive coordinator Wade Phillips assumed the head-coaching duties and was the acting head coach for the remainder of the game.

On December 6, Kubiak was fired from the Houston Texans with three games remaining in the 2013 season. He finished the 2013 season with a 2–11 record and was replaced by defensive coordinator/interim head coach Wade Phillips. Kubiak had a 61–64 regular season record and a 2–2 playoff record as the Texans' head coach.

=== Baltimore Ravens (2014) ===
On January 27, 2014, Kubiak signed with the Baltimore Ravens to be their new offensive coordinator. He served one season under John Harbaugh, replacing Jim Caldwell, who signed as the head coach of the Detroit Lions in the offseason. Prior to Kubiak's hiring by the Ravens, he interviewed for the vacant head coaching spot for the Detroit Lions, which would be taken by Caldwell on January 14, 2014. He also interviewed for the Miami Dolphins vacant offensive coordinator opening, before the job was taken by Bill Lazor.

As the offensive coordinator, Kubiak installed his version of the West Coast offense passing game combined with a zone-blocking scheme that gave way to play-action passes. Under his guidance, the Ravens had their most successful offense in 19 years, with quarterback Joe Flacco and running back Justin Forsett achieving career single-season highs in yards and touchdowns. Thanks in part to Kubiak's re-tooling of the offense, the Ravens returned to the playoffs after a one-year absence.

Due to his success in Baltimore, Kubiak became a highly sought-after head coaching candidate, receiving interest from the New York Jets, Chicago Bears, and the San Francisco 49ers, whom Kubiak previously coached in 1994 as the quarterbacks' coach and won Super Bowl XXIX that year. The Ravens made a big push to retain Kubiak as the offensive coordinator for the next season, and Kubiak initially announced his commitment to staying in Baltimore.

=== Denver Broncos (2015–2016) ===
It was not until his friend and former teammate John Elway offered him what he called his "dream job" – a chance to coach his former team, the Denver Broncos – that Kubiak expressed interest in a new head coaching position. The position only became available after Elway, who was then the general manager of the team, dismissed head coach John Fox after a poor playoff elimination. Kubiak called the opportunity a "game-changer" and said it was the only position that would entice him to leave the Ravens. Regarding the role and the Broncos organization, where he had spent 20 years as a player and assistant coach, he said: "This is where I got my start. This is home to me. It's just a chance of a lifetime."

On January 18, 2015, Kubiak signed a four-year deal to become the head coach of the Broncos. Wade Phillips, Kubiak's defensive coordinator with the Texans as well as a former Broncos head coach, joined Kubiak and the Broncos again to serve as defensive coordinator.

==== Super Bowl 50 victory: 2015 ====
Under Kubiak, the Broncos installed a run-oriented offense with zone blocking to blend in with quarterback Peyton Manning's shotgun passing style, but struggled with numerous changes and injuries to the offensive line. In addition, the 39-year-old Manning had his worst statistical season since his rookie year due to plantar fasciitis in his heel that he had suffered since the summer. Despite the offensive struggles, the Broncos succeeded with defense, led by Wade Phillips, who replaced his predecessor Jack Del Rio's complicated read-and-react 4–3 scheme with a simple aggressive 3–4 approach of attacking the ball. The Broncos' defense ranked No. 1 in total yards allowed, passing yards allowed and sacks, and like the previous three seasons, the team continued to set numerous individual, league and franchise records. Though the team had a 7–0 start, Manning led the NFL in interceptions.

In Week 10, Manning suffered a partial tear of the plantar fascia in his left foot. He set the NFL's all-time record for career passing yards in this game, but after throwing four interceptions, Kubiak benched Manning in the third quarter of the 29–13 home loss to the Kansas City Chiefs, in favor of backup quarterback Brock Osweiler, who took over as the starter for most of the remainder of the regular season. During the Week 17 regular season finale, however, where the Broncos were losing by a score of 13–7 against the 4–11 San Diego Chargers, Kubiak benched Osweiler and Manning re-claimed the starting quarterback position for the playoffs by leading the team to a key 27–20 win that enabled the team to finish the 2015 regular season with a 12–4 record, winning the AFC West and securing the number-one playoff seed in the AFC.

In the postseason, the Broncos defeated the Pittsburgh Steelers by a score of 23–16 in the divisional round and the New England Patriots 20–18 in the AFC Championship game, advancing to Super Bowl 50. The Broncos defeated the Carolina Panthers, 24–10 in Super Bowl 50, winning the title and giving Kubiak his first Super Bowl win as a head coach. Kubiak is the first person to have played in the Super Bowl and later win it as a head coach both with the same team.

==== Second health scare and stepping down: 2016 ====
The following season, Kubiak experienced numerous setbacks. During the offseason, the Broncos lost its two starting quarterbacks: Manning to retirement and Osweiler to free agency. As a result, Kubiak now had to integrate and juggle two new starting quarterbacks in Trevor Siemian and Paxton Lynch. Additionally, shortly after the Broncos' Week 5 loss to the Atlanta Falcons, Kubiak was rushed to a Denver-area hospital after experiencing flu-like symptoms and extreme body fatigue. According to Elway, Kubiak had been feeling ill prior to the loss to the Falcons, and following a precautionary MRI and CT scan, Kubiak was diagnosed with a "complex migraine." Special teams coordinator Joe DeCamillis served as the team's interim head coach for the team's Week 6 Thursday Night Football loss at the San Diego Chargers, while Kubiak underwent a doctor-mandated week of rest. It was the second time in three years in which Kubiak experienced a health scare in the middle of the season.

Kubiak led the Broncos to another winning season, but despite the 9–7 record, the team missed the playoffs for the first time after five straight division championships. Following a 24–6 victory over the Oakland Raiders in the regular season finale on January 1, 2017, Kubiak announced in a meeting with his team that he was stepping down from his position due to health issues. He made his retirement official during a press conference the next day, calling it an "extremely difficult decision" and thanking Elway, CEO Joe Ellis, owner Pat Bowlen, and the Broncos fans for their support of him. He was succeeded by Miami Dolphins defensive coordinator Vance Joseph, who had served as Kubiak's defensive backs coach during his tenure on the Houston Texans. In 2016, the National Polish-American Sports Hall of Fame awarded its NPASHF Excellence in Sports Award to Kubiak.

=== Minnesota Vikings (2019–2020) ===
After a two-year hiatus, Kubiak expressed interest in returning to coaching. Initial reports stated that Kubiak would return to the Denver Broncos coaching staff as offensive coordinator. However, the Broncos would reverse that decision days later due to disagreements with newly appointed head coach Vic Fangio on the team's potential offensive philosophy and staffing. While he had the opportunity to remain on the personnel department, Kubiak decided to leave the Broncos after spending a total of nearly a quarter century with the organization. Kubiak also interviewed for the Jacksonville Jaguars' vacant offensive coordinator spot in early 2019, a job that eventually went to John DeFilippo.

Kubiak would officially announce his return to coaching weeks later, joining Mike Zimmer's staff as an assistant head coach and offensive advisor for the Minnesota Vikings. He was promoted to offensive coordinator in 2020 following the departure of Kevin Stefanski, who left to accept the head coaching position of the Cleveland Browns. Kubiak's final game as an NFL coach was on January 3, 2021, a 37–35 win over the Detroit Lions. On January 21, 2021, Kubiak announced that he would be retiring from coaching, after 29 years.

== Executive career ==
=== Denver Broncos (2017–2018) ===
Many expected Kubiak to remain involved in football in a non-coaching capacity after stepping down as head coach. He remained in contact with Elway after his retirement, fueling speculation that he would remain involved with the organization. Six months after his retirement, Kubiak officially rejoined the Denver Broncos as a Senior Personnel Adviser. Basing himself out of his home in Texas, Kubiak would analyze offensive college prospects ahead of the draft and assist in free agency. Towards the end of the 2017 NFL season, Elway would promote Kubiak to an "enlarged" role within the front office – third in command behind Elway himself and director of player personnel Matt Russell.

Kubiak would eventually leave the position after two years to return to coaching.

=== Panthers Wrocław (2022–present) ===
In the beginning of 2022, Polish team Panthers Wrocław of the European League of Football acquired the services of Kubiak as a football advisor for players and coaching staff.

== Career statistics ==
=== Playing career ===
==== NFL ====
Legend
| **Bold** | Career high |

Regular season

| Year | Team | Games | | | Passing | | | | | | | | | Rushing | | | | | Sacks | |
| Year | Team | GP | GS | Record | Cmp | Att | Pct | Yds | Avg | Lng | TD | Int | Rtg | Att | Yds | Avg | Lng | TD | Sck | Yds |
|---|---|---|---|---|---|---|---|---|---|---|---|---|---|---|---|---|---|---|---|---|
| 1983 | DEN | 4 | 1 | 1–0 | 12 | 22 | 54.5 | 186 | 8.5 | **78** | 1 | 1 | 79.0 | 4 | 17 | 4.3 | 8 | **1** | 2 | 20 |
| 1984 | DEN | 7 | 2 | 1–1 | **44** | **75** | 58.7 | 440 | 5.9 | 41 | 4 | 1 | 87.6 | 9 | 27 | 3.0 | 17 | **1** | **10** | **86** |
| 1985 | DEN | 16 | 0 | — | 2 | 5 | 40.0 | 61 | **12.2** | 54 | 1 | 0 | **125.8** | 1 | 6 | **6.0** | 6 | 0 | 0 | 0 |
| 1986 | DEN | 16 | 0 | — | 23 | 38 | 60.5 | 249 | 6.6 | 26 | 1 | 3 | 55.7 | 6 | 22 | 3.7 | 10 | 0 | 3 | 23 |
| 1987 | DEN | 12 | 0 | — | 3 | 7 | 42.9 | 25 | 3.6 | 17 | 0 | 2 | 13.1 | 1 | 3 | 3.0 | 3 | 0 | 2 | 14 |
| 1988 | DEN | 16 | 1 | 0–1 | 43 | 69 | **62.3** | **497** | 7.2 | 68 | **5** | 3 | 90.1 | **17** | **65** | 4.1 | 15 | 0 | 2 | 13 |
| 1989 | DEN | 16 | 1 | 1–0 | 32 | 55 | 58.2 | 284 | 5.2 | 22 | 2 | 2 | 69.1 | 15 | 35 | 2.2 | 10 | 0 | 8 | 53 |
| 1990 | DEN | 16 | 0 | — | 11 | 22 | 50.0 | 145 | 6.6 | 36 | 0 | **4** | 31.6 | 9 | 52 | 3.3 | **18** | 0 | 3 | 19 |
| 1991 | DEN | 16 | 0 | — | 3 | 5 | 60.0 | 33 | 6.6 | 14 | 0 | 0 | 79.6 | 3 | 11 | 3.7 | 12 | 0 | 1 | 8 |
| Career | | 119 | 5 | 3–2 | 173 | 298 | 58.1 | 1,920 | 6.4 | 78 | 14 | 16 | 70.6 | 65 | 238 | 3.7 | 18 | 2 | 31 | 236 |

Postseason

| Year | Team | Games | | | Passing | | | | | | | | | Rushing | | | | | Sacks | |
| Year | Team | GP | GS | Record | Cmp | Att | Pct | Yds | Avg | Lng | TD | Int | Rtg | Att | Yds | Avg | Lng | TD | Sck | Yds |
|---|---|---|---|---|---|---|---|---|---|---|---|---|---|---|---|---|---|---|---|---|
| 1983 | DEN | 0 | 0 | — | DNP | | | | | | | | | | | | | | | |
| 1984 | DEN | 0 | 0 | — | DNP | | | | | | | | | | | | | | | |
| 1986 | DEN | 3 | 0 | — | 4 | 4 | **100.0** | 48 | **12.0** | 23 | 0 | 0 | **116.7** | 0 | 0 | 0.0 | 0 | 0 | 1 | 6 |
| 1987 | DEN | 3 | 0 | — | 0 | 0 | 0.0 | 0 | 0.0 | 0 | 0 | 0 | 0.0 | 2 | –3 | –1.5 | –1 | 0 | 0 | 0 |
| 1989 | DEN | 3 | 0 | — | 1 | 3 | 33.3 | 28 | 9.3 | **28** | 0 | 0 | 68.7 | 0 | 0 | 0.0 | 0 | 0 | **2** | 3 |
| 1991 | DEN | 2 | 0 | — | **11** | **12** | 91.7 | **136** | 11.3 | 24 | 0 | 0 | 113.9 | **3** | **22** | **7.3** | **11** | **1** | 1 | **10** |
| Career | | 11 | 0 | — | 16 | 19 | 84.2 | 212 | 11.2 | 28 | 0 | 0 | 113.2 | 5 | 19 | 3.8 | 11 | 1 | 4 | 19 |

==== College ====
| Year | Team | GP | Passing | | | | | | | | Rushing | | | |
| Year | Team | GP | Cmp | Att | Pct | Yds | Y/A | TD | Int | Rtg | Att | Yds | Avg | TD |
|---|---|---|---|---|---|---|---|---|---|---|---|---|---|---|
| 1979 | Texas A&M | 11 | 0 | 3 | 0.0 | 0 | 0.0 | 0 | 0 | 0.0 | 4 | –2 | –0.5 | 0 |
| 1980 | Texas A&M | 11 | 22 | 59 | 37.3 | 322 | 5.5 | 1 | 3 | 78.6 | 41 | 75 | 1.8 | 1 |
| 1981 | Texas A&M | 11 | 111 | 209 | 53.1 | 1,808 | 8.7 | 11 | 13 | 130.7 | 119 | 178 | 1.5 | 3 |
| 1982 | Texas A&M | 11 | 181 | 324 | 55.9 | 1,948 | 6.0 | 19 | 11 | 194.8 | 45 | −63 | −1.4 | 1 |
| Career | | 44 | 314 | 595 | 52.8 | 4,078 | 6.9 | 31 | 27 | 118.5 | 209 | 188 | 0.9 | 5 |

=== Head coaching record ===
| Team | Year | Regular season | | | | | Postseason | | | |
| Team | Year | Won | Lost | Ties | Win % | Finish | Won | Lost | Win % | Result |
|---|---|---|---|---|---|---|---|---|---|---|
| HOU | 2006 | 6 | 10 | 0 | .375 | 4th in AFC South | – | – | – | – |
| HOU | 2007 | 8 | 8 | 0 | .500 | 4th in AFC South | – | – | – | – |
| HOU | 2008 | 8 | 8 | 0 | .500 | 3rd in AFC South | – | – | – | – |
| HOU | 2009 | 9 | 7 | 0 | .563 | 2nd in AFC South | – | – | – | – |
| HOU | 2010 | 6 | 10 | 0 | .375 | 3rd in AFC South | – | – | – | – |
| HOU | 2011 | 10 | 6 | 0 | .625 | **1st in AFC South** | 1 | 1 | .500 | **Lost to Baltimore Ravens in AFC Divisional Game** |
| HOU | 2012 | 12 | 4 | 0 | .750 | **1st in AFC South** | 1 | 1 | .500 | **Lost to New England Patriots in AFC Divisional Game** |
| HOU | 2013 | 2 | 11 | 0 | .154 | Fired | – | – | – | |
| HOU total | | 61 | 64 | 0 | .488 | | 2 | 2 | .500 | |
| DEN | 2015 | 12 | 4 | 0 | .750 | **1st in AFC West** | 3 | 0 | 1.000 | **Super Bowl 50 champions** |
| DEN | 2016 | 9 | 7 | 0 | .563 | 3rd in AFC West | – | – | – | – |
| DEN total | | 21 | 11 | 0 | .656 | | 3 | 0 | 1.000 | |
| Total | | 82 | 75 | 0 | .522 | | 5 | 2 | .714 | |

== Personal life ==
Kubiak and his wife, Rhonda, have three sons: Klint, Klay, and Klein. Klint attended Colorado State University (CSU), where he played safety for the Colorado State Rams football team from 2005 to 2009 and is the current Las Vegas Raiders' head coach. From 2007 to 2010, Klay was a quarterback at Colorado State, and is the offensive coordinator for the San Francisco 49ers. Klein played wide receiver for Rice University from 2010 to 2013 and was the Southwest Area Scout for the Denver Broncos from 2017 to 2018; he is currently an area scout for the Dallas Cowboys.
