= Klay Kubiak =

American football player and coach (born 1988)

San Francisco 49ers
- Title: Offensive coordinator

Personal information
- Born: October 10, 1988 (age 38); Houston, Texas, U.S.

Career information
- Position: Quarterback
- High school: Regis Jesuit (Aurora, Colorado)
- College: Colorado State (2007–2010)

Career history
- Strake Jesuit College Prep (2013–2020); Offensive coordinator (2013–2015, 2017); Head coach (2018–2020); San Francisco 49ers (2021–present); Defensive quality control coach (2021); Assistant quarterbacks coach (2022–2023); Offensive passing game specialist (2024); Offensive coordinator (2025–present)

Head coaching record
- Career: 24–11 (high school)
- Coaching profile at Pro Football Reference

Klay Anthony Kubiak (born October 10, 1988) is an American professional football coach who is the offensive coordinator for the San Francisco 49ers of the National Football League (NFL).

Kubiak played college football at Colorado State as a quarterback from 2007 to 2010 and has previously served as the head coach at Strake Jesuit College Preparatory from 2018 to 2020. He is the son of former NFL coach Gary Kubiak.

== Early life ==
Kubiak attended Colorado State University (CSU), where he played quarterback for the Colorado State Rams football team from 2007 to 2010. Kubiak appeared in four games completing 19 passes for 252 yards and two interceptions.

== Coaching career ==
=== Strake Jesuit College Preparatory ===
After getting his master's degree in English at TCU, Kubiak was hired as offensive coordinator for the Strake Jesuit Crusaders. Prior to the 2018 season, he was promoted to head coach of the Crusaders. In three seasons as head coach, Kubiak led the Crusaders to a 24–11 record and three playoff appearances.

=== San Francisco 49ers ===
In 2021, Kubiak was hired by the San Francisco 49ers as a defensive quality control coach under head coach Kyle Shanahan. The following year, he was named assistant quarterbacks coach. In 2024, Kubiak was named offensive passing game specialist. He was promoted to offensive coordinator on January 8, 2025, with play calling handled by head coach Kyle Shanahan.

== Personal life ==
Kubiak is married to his wife, Marissa. Klay is the second son of former NFL coach Gary Kubiak. He has two brothers, Klint, the head coach of the Las Vegas Raiders, and Klein, a scout for the Dallas Cowboys.
