= Klint Kubiak =

American football player and coach (born 1987)

Las Vegas Raiders
- Title: Head coach

Personal information
- Born: February 17, 1987 (age 39); Houston, Texas, U.S.
- Listed height: 6 ft 1 in (1.85 m)
- Listed weight: 204 lb (93 kg)

Career information
- Position: Safety (No. 20)
- High school: Regis Jesuit (Aurora, Colorado)
- College: Colorado State (2005–2009)

Career history
- Texas A&M (2010–2012); Offensive quality control coach (2010–2011); Graduate assistant (2012); Minnesota Vikings (2013–2014) Offensive quality control coach; Kansas (2015) Wide receivers coach; Denver Broncos (2016–2018) Offensive assistant; Minnesota Vikings (2019–2021); Quarterbacks coach (2019–2020); Offensive coordinator (2021); Denver Broncos (2022) Passing game coordinator & quarterbacks coach; San Francisco 49ers (2023) Passing game coordinator; New Orleans Saints (2024) Offensive coordinator; Seattle Seahawks (2025) Offensive coordinator; Las Vegas Raiders (2026–present) Head coach

Awards and highlights
- Super Bowl champion (LX); Sporting News Coordinator of the Year (2025)

Head coaching record
- Regular season: 4–4 (.500)
- Coaching profile at Pro Football Reference

Klint Alexander Kubiak (born February 17, 1987) is an American professional football coach and former player who is the head coach for the Las Vegas Raiders of the National Football League (NFL). He previously served as the offensive coordinator for the Seattle Seahawks in 2025, winning Super Bowl LX.

Kubiak played college football at Colorado State as a safety from 2005 to 2009 and has previously served as an assistant coach at Texas A&M University, the University of Kansas, Minnesota Vikings, Denver Broncos, San Francisco 49ers, New Orleans Saints, and Seahawks. He is the son of former NFL coach Gary Kubiak.

== Early life ==
Kubiak was born in Houston, while his father, Gary Kubiak, played quarterback for the Denver Broncos. He attended Regis Jesuit High School in Aurora, Colorado, where he played as a wide receiver and defensive back, while his father worked as offensive coordinator for the Denver Broncos. Kubiak attended Colorado State University (CSU), where he played safety for the Colorado State Rams football team from 2005 to 2009. Kubiak was named a team captain as a senior and was invited to play in the East-West Shrine Game.

Pre-draft measurables
Height	Weight	40-yard dash	10-yard split	20-yard split	20-yard shuttle	Three-cone drill	Vertical jump	Broad jump
6 ft 1 in (1.85 m)	204 lb (93 kg)	4.80 s	1.69 s	2.81 s	4.38 s	6.87 s	35.0 in (0.89 m)	9 ft 10 in (3.00 m)
All values from Pro Day

== Coaching career ==
=== Texas A&M ===
Kubiak started his coaching career at Texas A&M University as an offensive quality control coach from 2010 to 2011 and as a graduate assistant and inside receivers coach in 2012. During his three years with the Aggies, Kubiak earned his master's degree in human resource development.

=== Minnesota Vikings ===
In 2013, Kubiak was hired by the Minnesota Vikings as an offensive quality control and assistant wide receivers coach under offensive coordinators Bill Musgrave (2013) and Norv Turner (2014).

=== Kansas ===
In 2015, Kubiak accepted a position at the University of Kansas to coach the wide receivers.

=== Denver Broncos ===
On February 22, 2016, Kubiak was hired by the Denver Broncos as an offensive assistant while his father, Gary, was the head coach of the team. During the 2017 season, Kubiak assumed responsibilities as the primary quarterbacks coach for the final six weeks of the regular season after Bill Musgrave was promoted to offensive coordinator.

=== Minnesota Vikings (second stint) ===
On January 14, 2019, Kubiak was hired by the Minnesota Vikings as their quarterbacks coach under offensive coordinator Kevin Stefanski and head coach Mike Zimmer.

On February 8, 2021, Kubiak was promoted to offensive coordinator, replacing his father, Gary Kubiak, following his retirement.

=== Denver Broncos (second stint) ===
On February 2, 2022, Kubiak was re-hired by the Denver Broncos as their passing game coordinator and quarterbacks coach under offensive coordinator Justin Outten and head coach Nathaniel Hackett. Following offensive struggles to start the 2022 season, Hackett relinquished play calling duties to Kubiak on November 20.

=== San Francisco 49ers ===
On March 23, 2023, Kubiak was hired by the San Francisco 49ers as their passing game coordinator.

=== New Orleans Saints ===
On February 14, 2024, the New Orleans Saints hired Kubiak to be their new offensive coordinator for the 2024 season, replacing longtime offensive coordinator Pete Carmichael Jr.

=== Seattle Seahawks ===
On January 26, 2025, the Seattle Seahawks hired Kubiak as their offensive coordinator under Mike Macdonald, replacing Ryan Grubb, who had been fired at the end of the 2024 season. In spite of muted expectations for his unit, which had traded away starting quarterback Geno Smith and receiver DK Metcalf during the offseason in addition to releasing veteran Tyler Lockett, Kubiak turned around an offense that had ranked around the middle of the pack or worse in several statistical categories. Headlined by free-agent quarterback Sam Darnold, third-year receiver Jaxon Smith-Njigba, as well as running backs Kenneth Walker and Zach Charbonnet, by week 10, his offense ranked top 5 in points scored, with Smith-Njigba leading the league in receiving yards and Darnold graded as the league's best quarterback by Pro Football Focus while leading in EPA per play and yards per attempt.

The Seahawks finished the season with a 29–13 victory over the New England Patriots in Super Bowl LX. The 483 total points Kubiak's unit put up during the regular season were good for 28.4 points per game and contributed to Seattle's league-leading +191 point differential, all franchise records. At season's end, Kubiak was named a finalist for AP Assistant Coach of the Year, but lost to the Patriots' Josh McDaniels; The Sporting News named him Coordinator of the Year. In Kubiak's system, Smith-Njigba led the league in regular-season receiving yards with 1,793 and won AP Offensive Player of the Year, as well as being unanimously named a first-team All-Pro.

=== Las Vegas Raiders ===
On February 2, 2026, the Las Vegas Raiders agreed to terms to hire Kubiak as their next head coach. The agreement did not become official until after the conclusion of Super Bowl LX. He was named the 25th head coach of the Raiders on February 9, the day after the Super Bowl, replacing Pete Carroll after he was fired due to the Raiders having a losing season.

== Head coaching record ==
Team	Year	Regular season					Postseason			
Team	Year	Won	Lost	Ties	Win %	Finish	Won	Lost	Win %	Result
LV	2026	4	5	0	.500	TBD in AFC West				
Total		4	5	0	.500					

== Personal life ==
Kubiak is a Christian. He is the oldest son of former NFL coach Gary Kubiak. Kubiak has two younger brothers: Klay, the offensive coordinator for the San Francisco 49ers, and Klein, a national scout for the Dallas Cowboys.
