= 2018 San Francisco 49ers season =

American football team season

- Owner: Jed York
- General manager: John Lynch
- Head coach: Kyle Shanahan
- Offensive coordinator: Kyle Shanahan (de facto)
- Defensive coordinator: Robert Saleh
- Home stadium: Levi's Stadium

Results
- Record: 4–12
- Division place: 3rd NFC West
- Playoffs: Did not qualify
- All-Pros: George Kittle (2nd team)
- Pro Bowlers: FB Kyle Juszczyk; TE George Kittle; DT DeForest Buckner

Uniform
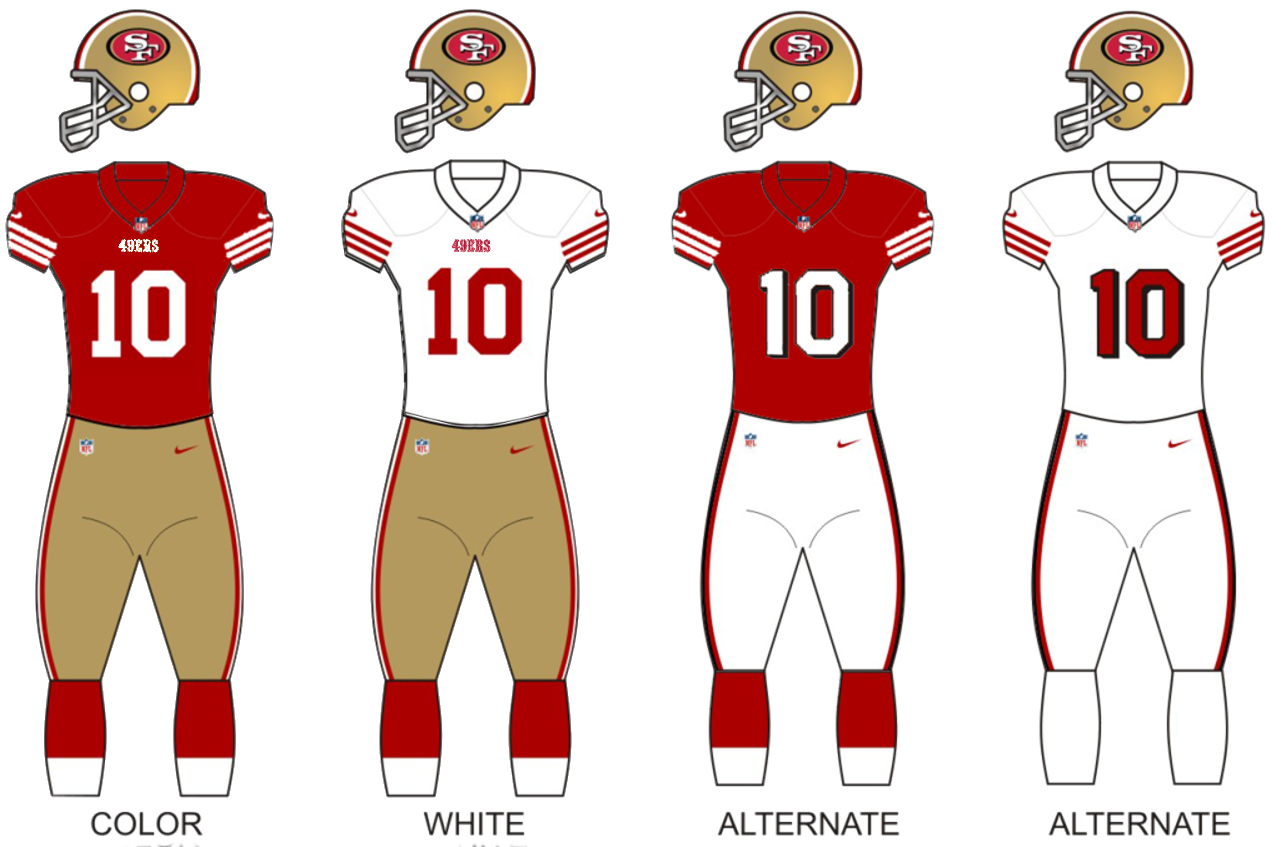

The 2018 season was the San Francisco 49ers' 69th in the National Football League (NFL), their 73rd overall, their fifth playing their home games at Levi's Stadium and their second under the head coach/general manager tandem of Kyle Shanahan and John Lynch.

After finishing 6–10 from an 0–9 start the previous year, the 49ers entered the season with high expectations and looked to make the playoffs for the first time since 2013. However, the 49ers' season ended with a record of 4–12 and were plagued by multiple season-ending injuries, including running back Jerick McKinnon tearing his ACL in training camp and quarterback Jimmy Garoppolo tearing his ACL in Week 3 against the Kansas City Chiefs. The 49ers were eliminated from playoff contention following a Week 13 loss to the Seattle Seahawks. In Week 15, however, the 49ers upset the Seahawks 26–23 in overtime at home, snapping the 49ers' 10–game losing streak to them that dated back to the 2013 NFC Championship Game. The win also stopped the Seahawks from clinching a playoff spot that week. The 49ers failed to improve on their 6–10 record from last year. The 49ers also went 0–8 on the road for the first time since 1979.

The 49ers defense would also go on to set multiple NFL records for futility. During the entire 16 game schedule of the 2018 NFL season, the 49ers defense would accumulate just two interceptions, breaking the previous mark of three. Incredibly, that included strike shortened NFL seasons. Putting that into perspective, a total of 40 different players throughout the league would go on to have more interceptions than the entire 49ers team. The 49ers would also have just seven total takeaways on the season, smashing the previous record of 11. Both records would stand until 2025, when the New York Jets would surpass both marks with zero interceptions and four turnovers in an even longer 17-game regular season. The 49ers were also last in the league with a −25 turnover differential, the worst mark since 2008.

The 2018 49ers would go on to set one more notable "futility" mark after the team went 8–0 to start the following season, thus giving the 2018 49ers the worst record in NFL history of any team that went on to go undefeated that far into the following season.

== Offseason ==
=== Roster changes ===
==== Free agency ====
The 49ers entered free agency with the following:

Position	Player	Free agency tag	Date signed	2018 Team	Notes
DE	Cornellius Carradine	UFA	March 17, 2018	Oakland Raiders	
OT	Garry Gilliam	UFA	February 27, 2018	San Francisco 49ers	Signed 2-year contract
SS	Eric Reid	UFA	September 27, 2018	Carolina Panthers	Signed 1-year contract
C	Daniel Kilgore	UFA	February 14, 2018	San Francisco 49ers	Signed 3-year contract
ILB	Brock Coyle	UFA	March 14, 2018	San Francisco 49ers	Signed 3-year contract
G	Brandon Fusco	UFA	March 14, 2018	Atlanta Falcons	Signed 3-year contract
CB	Leon Hall	UFA	March 30, 2018	Oakland Raiders	
RB	Carlos Hyde	UFA	March 15, 2018	Cleveland Browns	Signed 3-year contract
OLB	Mark Nzeocha	UFA	January 26, 2018	San Francisco 49ers	Signed 1-year contract
DT	Leger Douzable	UFA			
WR	Louis Murphy	UFA			
QB	Jimmy Garoppolo	UFA	February 8, 2018	San Francisco 49ers	Signed 5-year contract
CB	Asa Jackson	UFA			
TE	Logan Paulsen	UFA	March 21, 2018	Atlanta Falcons	Signed 1-year contract
C	Tim Barnes	UFA			
FS	Antone Exum	UFA	June 6, 2018	San Francisco 49ers	Signed 1-year contract
OLB	Cassius Marsh	UFA	February 7, 2018	San Francisco 49ers	Signed 2-year contract
CB	Dontae Johnson	UFA	April 11, 2018	Seattle Seahawks	
DE	Aaron Lynch	UFA	March 15, 2018	Chicago Bears	Signed 1-year contract
RB	Raheem Mostert	RFA	March 9, 2018	San Francisco 49ers	Signed 1-year contract
RFA: Restricted free agent, UFA: Unrestricted free agent, ERFA: Exclusive rights free agent LEGEND – Light green background indicates a player has been re-signed by the 49ers. – Light red background indicates a player has departed the 49ers.

==== Signings ====
Position	Player	2017 Team	Date signed	Notes
CB	Richard Sherman	Seattle Seahawks	March 11, 2018	Signed 3-year contract
P	Jeff Locke		March 12, 2018	Signed 1-year contract
RB	Jerick McKinnon	Minnesota Vikings	March 14, 2018	Signed 4-year contract
C	Weston Richburg	New York Giants	March 14, 2018	Signed 5-year contract
DE	Jeremiah Attaochu	Los Angeles Chargers	March 15, 2018	Signed 1-year contract
G	Jonathan Cooper	Dallas Cowboys	March 20, 2018	Signed 1-year contract
LB	Korey Toomer	Los Angeles Chargers	April 4, 2018	Signed 1-year contract
G	Mike Person	Indianapolis Colts	May 9, 2018	Signed 1-year contract
CB	C. J. Goodwin	New York Giants	May 15, 2018	Claimed off waivers
G	John Flynn		July 25, 2018	Signed 2-year contract
DT	Will Sutton		July 25, 2018	Signed 1-year contract
DT	Cedric Thornton	Buffalo Bills	July 25, 2018	Signed 1-year contract
TE	Wes Saxton		July 31, 2018	Signed 1-year contract
G	Chris Gonzalez		August 5, 2018	Signed 1-year contract
RB	Alfred Morris	Dallas Cowboys	August 14, 2018	Signed 1-year contract

Indicates that the player was a free agent at the end of his respective team's 2017 season.

==== Departures ====
Position	Player	Date	Notes
C	Daniel Kilgore	March 15, 2018	Traded
T	Trent Brown	April 27, 2018	Traded
G	Zane Beadles	May 7, 2018	Released
WR	DeAndre Carter	May 15, 2018	Waived
S	Don Jones	July 25, 2018	Waived
CB	C. J. Goodwin	July 31, 2018	Waived
LB	Eli Harold	August 23, 2018	Traded

== Draft ==
2018 San Francisco 49ers draft
Round	Pick	Player	Position	College	Notes
1	9	Mike McGlinchey	OT	Notre Dame	
2	44	Dante Pettis	WR	Washington	from Washington
3	70	Fred Warner *	LB	BYU	from Chicago
3	95	Tarvarius Moore	S	Southern Miss	from New England
4	128	Kentavius Street	DE	NC State	from Pittsburgh
5	142	D. J. Reed	CB	Kansas State	from Denver via Washington
6	184	Marcell Harris	S	Florida	
7	233	Jullian Taylor	DT	Temple	from Tampa Bay via Miami
7	240	Richie James	WR	Middle Tennessee	from Kansas City
Made roster * Made at least one Pro Bowl during career

Notes

- The 49ers finished with the same overall record and strength of schedule as the Oakland Raiders at the end of the 2017 season, and their selecting order was determined by way of a coin flip at the NFL Scouting Combine in early 2018. Both teams will then rotate with the Miami Dolphins, selecting 9th, 10th and 11th in each round. The 49ers won the coin toss.

Draft trades

- The 49ers traded a second-round selection (43rd overall) to New England in exchange for quarterback Jimmy Garoppolo.
- The 49ers traded their third-round selection in 2017 (67th overall) to New Orleans in exchange for New Orleans' second-round selection (59th overall) and their seventh-round selection in 2017 (229th overall).
- The 49ers traded their first-round selection in 2017 (2nd overall) to Chicago in exchange for Chicago's third-round selection (70th overall), and their first-, third- and fourth-round selections in 2017 (3rd, 67th and 111th overall).
- The 49ers traded their fourth-round selection (109th overall) to Denver in exchange for Denver's fifth-round selection in 2017 (177th overall) and running back Kapri Bibbs.
- The 49ers traded their fifth-round selection (148th overall) and tight end Vance McDonald to Pittsburgh in exchange for Pittsburgh's fourth-round selection (128th overall).
- The 49ers traded cornerback Rashard Robinson to the New York Jets in exchange for the Jets' fifth-round selection (143rd overall).
- The 49ers traded their seventh-round selection (227th overall) and center Daniel Kilgore to Miami in exchange for the seventh-round selection Miami acquired from Tampa Bay (223rd overall).
- The 49ers traded cornerback Kenneth Acker to Kansas City in exchange for Kansas City's seventh-round selection (240th overall).
- The 49ers traded their fifth-round selection (143rd overall) and OT Trent Brown to New England in exchange for the third-round selection (95th overall).

=== Undrafted free agents ===
2018 San Francisco 49ers undrafted free agents
Position	Player	College	Notes
WR	Steven Dunbar	Houston	
TE	Ross Dwelley	San Diego	
QB	Jack Heneghan	Dartmouth	
OL	Alan Knott	South Carolina	Waived August 14
OT	Jamar McGloster	Syracuse	Waived July 25
DL	Zach Franklin	Frostburg State	
S	Terrell Williams	Houston	
S	Corey Griffin	Georgia Tech	Waived August 5
CB	Tarvarus McFadden	Florida State	
CB	Emmanuel Moseley	Tennessee	
OL	Najee Toran	UCLA	
OL	Coleman Shelton	Washington	
RB	Jeff Wilson	North Texas	
DL	Blaine Woodson	Delaware	Waived July 25

== Personnel ==
=== Staff / Coaches ===
2018 San Francisco 49ers staff
Front office: Co-chairman – Denise DeBartolo York; Co-chairman – John York; Chief executive officer – Jed York; Co-owner – John M. Sobrato; Co-owner – Mark Wan; Co-owner – Gideon Yu; General manager – John Lynch; President of 49ers Enterprises and EVP of football operations – Paraag Marathe; President – Al Guido; General counsel – Hannah Gordon; Chief investment officer – Brano Perkovich; Chief financial officer – Scott Sabatino; Vice president of player personnel – Adam Peters; Senior personnel executive – Martin Mayhew; Vice president and senior advisor to the general manager – Keena Turner; Director of pro personnel – Ran Carthon; Director of football administration & analytics – Brian Hampton; Head coaches: Head coach – Kyle Shanahan; Assistant head coach/tight ends – Jon Embree; Offensive coaches: Run game specialist – Mike McDaniel; Quarterbacks – Rich Scangarello; Running backs – Bobby Turner; Passing game specialist/wide receivers – Mike LaFleur; Offensive line – John Benton; Assistant offensive line – Adam Stenavich; Offensive assistant – T.C. McCartney; Offensive assistant – Katie Sowers; Offensive quality control – Taylor Embree	Defensive coaches: Defensive coordinator – Robert Saleh; Defensive line – Jeff Zgonina; Run game specialist/outside linebackers – Johnny Holland; Inside linebackers – DeMeco Ryans; Defensive backs – Jeff Hafley; Assistant defensive backs – Daniel Bullocks; Defensive quality control – Bobby Slowik; Pass rush specialist – Chris Kiffin; Special teams coaches: Special teams coordinator – Richard Hightower; Assistant special teams – Michael Clay; Assistant special teams – Stan Kwan; Strength and conditioning: Head strength and conditioning – Ray Wright; Strength and conditioning assistant – Marquis Johnson; Strength and conditioning assistant – Dustin Perry

=== Final roster ===
2018 San Francisco 49ers roster
Quarterbacks (QB): 3 C. J. Beathard; 4 Nick Mullens; Running backs (RB): 43 Matthew Dayes; 44 Kyle Juszczyk FB; 46 Alfred Morris; 41 Jeff Wilson; Wide receivers (WR): 84 Kendrick Bourne; 19 Steven Dunbar; 11 Marquise Goodwin; 13 Richie James; 14 Max McCaffrey; 81 Trent Taylor; Tight ends (TE): 88 Garrett Celek; 82 Ross Dwelley; 85 George Kittle	Offensive linemen (OL): 78 Shon Coleman T; 65 Joshua Garnett G; 76 Garry Gilliam T; 62 Erik Magnuson C; 69 Mike McGlinchey T; 68 Mike Person G; 58 Weston Richburg C; 74 Joe Staley T; 75 Laken Tomlinson G; Defensive linemen (DL): 91 Arik Armstead DE; 98 Ronald Blair DE; 99 DeForest Buckner DT; 96 Sheldon Day DT; 92 Ryan Delaire DE; 93 D. J. Jones DT; 54 Cassius Marsh DE; 90 Earl Mitchell DT; 77 Jullian Taylor DT; 94 Solomon Thomas DE	Linebackers (LB): 47 Elijah Lee OLB; 53 Mark Nzeocha OLB; 57 James Onwualu MLB; 51 Malcolm Smith OLB; 55 Pita Taumoepenu OLB; 48 Fred Warner MLB; Defensive backs (DB): 38 Antone Exum SS; 36 Marcell Harris SS; 35 Godwin Igwebuike FS; 26 Greg Mabin CB; 33 Tarvarius Moore CB/FS; 30 Tyvis Powell SS; 32 D. J. Reed FS/CB; 49 Tyree Robinson FS; 25 Richard Sherman CB; 24 K'Waun Williams CB; Special teams (ST): 9 Robbie Gould K; 40 Colin Holba LS; 5 Bradley Pinion P	Practice squad: 64 Christian DiLauro T; 83 Marcus Lucas TE; 45 Tarvarus McFadden CB; 17 Jordan Smallwood WR; 66 Najee Toran G; 6 Terrell Williams FS; Reserve: 22 Matt Breida RB (IR); 27 Adrian Colbert FS (IR); 50 Brock Coyle OLB (IR); 60 JP Flynn C/G (IR); 15 Pierre Garçon WR (IR); 10 Jimmy Garoppolo QB (IR); 28 Jerick McKinnon RB (IR); 41 Emmanuel Moseley CB (IR); 31 Raheem Mostert RB (IR); 86 Kyle Nelson LS (Susp.); 18 Dante Pettis WR (IR); 95 Kentavius Street DE (NF-Inj.); 29 Jaquiski Tartt SS (IR); 20 Jimmie Ward CB/FS (IR); 97 Dekoda Watson OLB (IR); 23 Ahkello Witherspoon CB (IR); Rookies in italics 53 active, 16 reserve, 6 practice squad

== Preseason ==
Week	Date	Opponent	Result	Record	Venue	Recap
1	August 9	Dallas Cowboys	W 24–21	1–0	Levi's Stadium	Recap
2	August 18	at Houston Texans	L 13–16	1–1	NRG Stadium	Recap
3	August 25	at Indianapolis Colts	L 17–23	1–2	Lucas Oil Stadium	Recap
4	August 30	Los Angeles Chargers	L 21–23	1–3	Levi's Stadium	Recap

== Regular season ==
=== Schedule ===
Week	Date	Opponent	Result	Record	Venue	Recap
1	September 9	at Minnesota Vikings	**L** 16–24	0–1	U.S. Bank Stadium	Recap
2	September 16	Detroit Lions	**W** 30–27	1–1	Levi's Stadium	Recap
3	September 23	at Kansas City Chiefs	**L** 27–38	1–2	Arrowhead Stadium	Recap
4	September 30	at Los Angeles Chargers	**L** 27–29	1–3	StubHub Center	Recap
5	October 7	**Arizona Cardinals**	**L** 18–28	1–4	Levi's Stadium	Recap
6	October 15	at Green Bay Packers	**L** 30–33	1–5	Lambeau Field	Recap
7	October 21	**Los Angeles Rams**	**L** 10–39	1–6	Levi's Stadium	Recap
8	October 28	at **Arizona Cardinals**	**L** 15–18	1–7	State Farm Stadium	Recap
9	November 1	Oakland Raiders	**W** 34–3	2–7	Levi's Stadium	Recap
10	November 12	New York Giants	**L** 23–27	2–8	Levi's Stadium	Recap
11	Bye					
12	November 25	at Tampa Bay Buccaneers	**L** 9–27	2–9	Raymond James Stadium	Recap
13	December 2	at **Seattle Seahawks**	**L** 16–43	2–10	CenturyLink Field	Recap
14	December 9	Denver Broncos	**W** 20–14	3–10	Levi's Stadium	Recap
15	December 16	**Seattle Seahawks**	**W** 26–23 (OT)	4–10	Levi's Stadium	Recap
16	December 23	Chicago Bears	**L** 9–14	4–11	Levi's Stadium	Recap
17	December 30	at **Los Angeles Rams**	**L** 32–48	4–12	Los Angeles Memorial Coliseum	Recap
Note: Intra-division opponents are in **bold** text.

=== Game summaries ===
==== Week 1: at Minnesota Vikings ====
Week One: San Francisco 49ers at Minnesota Vikings – Game summary

Quarter	1	2	3	4	Total
49ers	0	3	10	3	**16**
**Vikings**	3	7	14	0	**24**

at U.S. Bank Stadium, Minneapolis, Minnesota

- Date: September 9
- Game time: 12:00 p.m. CDT/10:00 a.m. PDT
- Game weather: Played indoors (dome stadium)
- Game attendance: 66,673
- Referee: Clay Martin
- TV announcers (Fox): Kevin Burkhardt, Charles Davis and Pam Oliver
- Recap

Game information

**First quarter**

- MIN – Daniel Carlson 48-yard field goal, 3:56. Vikings 3–0. **Drive: 7 plays, 40 yards, 3:21.**

**Second quarter**

- MIN – Stefon Diggs 22-yard pass from Kirk Cousins (Daniel Carlson kick), 13:39. Vikings 10–0. **Drive: 6 plays, 53 yards, 2:32.**
- SF – Robbie Gould 42-yard field goal, 11:42. Vikings 10–3. **Drive: 7 plays, 51 yards, 1:57.**

**Third quarter**

- MIN – Mike Hughes 28-yard interception return (Daniel Carlson kick), 10:41. Vikings 17–3.
- SF – Robbie Gould 33-yard field goal, 9:15. Vikings 17–6. **Drive: 5 plays, 60 yards, 1:26.**
- MIN – Kyle Rudolph 11-yard pass from Kirk Cousins (Daniel Carlson kick), 4:22. Vikings 24–6. **Drive: 9 plays, 75 yards, 4:53.**
- SF – Dante Pettis 22-yard pass from Jimmy Garoppolo (Robbie Gould kick), 0:31. Vikings 24–13. **Drive: 7 plays, 75 yards, 3:51.**

**Fourth quarter**

- SF – Robbie Gould 22-yard field goal, 8:09. Vikings 24–16. **Drive: 11 plays, 82 yards, 5:34.**

**Top passers**

- SF – Jimmy Garoppolo – 15/33, 261 yards, TD, 3 INT
- MIN – Kirk Cousins – 20/36, 244 yards, 2 TD

**Top rushers**

- SF – Matt Breida – 11 rushes, 46 yards
- MIN – Latavius Murray – 11 rushes, 42 yards

**Top receivers**

- SF – George Kittle – 5 receptions, 90 yards
- MIN – Adam Thielen – 6 receptions, 102 yards

Three interceptions by Jimmy Garoppolo, who earned his first loss as an NFL starter, would hurt the 49ers in the end. The 49ers lost 24–16, with the difference being a Garoppolo pick-six as well several key drops by receivers. With the loss, the 49ers started their season 0-1 for the second consecutive season.

==== Week 2: vs. Detroit Lions ====
Week Two: Detroit Lions at San Francisco 49ers – Game summary

Quarter	1	2	3	4	Total
Lions	7	3	3	14	**27**
**49ers**	3	10	14	3	**30**

at Levi's Stadium, Santa Clara, California

- Date: September 16
- Game time: 1:05 pm. PDT
- Game weather: 73 °F (23 °C), clear
- Game attendance: 70,164
- Referee: Shawn Hochuli
- TV announcers (Fox): Thom Brennaman, Chris Spielman and Shannon Spake
- Recap

Game information

**First quarter**

- SF – Robbie Gould 45-yard field goal, 6:18. 49ers 3–0. **Drive: 8 plays, 63 yards, 4:34.**
- DET – Kenny Golladay 30-yard pass from Matthew Stafford (Matt Prater kick), 2:45. Lions 7–3. **Drive: 7 plays, 69 yards, 3:33.**

**Second quarter**

- SF – Kendrick Bourne 4-yard pass from Jimmy Garoppolo (Robbie Gould kick), 12:07. 49ers 10–7. **Drive: 13 plays, 88 yards, 5:38.**
- SF – Robbie Gould 42-yard field goal, 4:55. 49ers 13–7. **Drive: 4 plays, -8 yards, 1:35.**
- DET – Matt Prater 27-yard field goal, 0:03. 49ers 13–10. **Drive: 9 plays, 57 yards, 0:46.**

**Third quarter**

- SF – Garrett Celek 11-yard pass from Jimmy Garoppolo (Robbie Gould kick), 13:17. 49ers 20–10. **Drive: 4 plays, 26 yards, 1:43.**
- DET – Matt Prater 43-yard field goal, 8:46. 49ers 20–13. **Drive: 8 plays, 27 yards, 4:31.**
- SF – Matt Breida 66-yard run (Robbie Gould kick), 0:52. 49ers 27–13. **Drive: 3 plays, 97 yards, 1:13.**

**Fourth quarter**

- SF – Robbie Gould 36-yard field goal, 11:21. 49ers 30–13. **Drive: 7 plays, 35 yards, 3:22.**
- DET – Marvin Jones 5-yard pass from Matthew Stafford (Matt Prater kick), 8:36. 49ers 30–20. **Drive: 5 plays, 80 yards, 2:45.**
- DET - Michael Roberts 15-yard pass from Matthew Stafford (Matt Prater kick), 3:27. 49ers 30–27. **Drive: 12 plays, 79 yards, 2:41.**

**Top passers**

- DET – Matthew Stafford – 34/53, 347 yards, 3 TDs
- SF – Jimmy Garoppolo – 18/26, 206 yards, 2 TDs

**Top rushers**

- DET – Kerryon Johnson – 8 carries, 43 yards
- SF – Matt Breida – 11 carries, 138 yards, TD

**Top receivers**

- DET – Golden Tate – 7 receptions, 109 yards
- SF – Pierre Garçon – 4 receptions, 57 yards

Despite the Lions' attempted comeback in the fourth quarter, the 49ers would hang on to win 30-27 as the team earns their first win of the season behind 2 touchdowns from Garoppolo and Matt Breida's 138 yards rushing. With the win, the 49ers evened their record to 1-1

==== Week 3: at Kansas City Chiefs ====
Week Three: San Francisco 49ers at Kansas City Chiefs – Game summary

Quarter	1	2	3	4	Total
49ers	0	10	14	3	**27**
**Chiefs**	14	21	0	3	**38**

at Arrowhead Stadium, Kansas City, Missouri

- Date: September 23
- Game time: 12:00 pm. CDT/10:00 am. PDT
- Game weather: 70 °F (21 °C), clear and sunny
- Game attendance: 76,023
- Referee: Tony Corrente
- TV announcers (Fox): Thom Brennaman, Chris Spielman and Shannon Spake
- Recap

Game information

**First quarter**

- KC – Kareem Hunt 1-yard run (Harrison Butker kick), 8:24. Chiefs 7–0. **Drive: 11 plays, 57 yards, 4:55.**
- KC – Kareem Hunt 1-yard run (Harrison Butker kick), 2:20. Chiefs 14–0. **Drive: 8 plays, 84 yards, 3:26.**

**Second quarter**

- SF – Kyle Juszczyk 35-yard pass from Jimmy Garoppolo (Robbie Gould kick), 11:52. Chiefs 14–7. **Drive: 8 plays, 75 yards, 5:28.**
- KC – Chris Conley 4-yard pass from Patrick Mahomes (Harrison Butker kick), 8:54. Chiefs 21–7. **Drive: 5 plays, 75 yards, 2:58.**
- KC – Demetrius Harris 13-yard pass from Patrick Mahomes (Harrison Butker kick), 3:37. Chiefs 28–7. **Drive: 8 plays, 72 yards, 3:35.**
- KC – Sammy Watkins 12-yard pass from Patrick Mahomes (Harrison Butker kick), 0:34. Chiefs 35–7. **Drive: 9 plays, 68 yards, 1:26.**
- SF – Robbie Gould 39-yard field goal, 0:00. Chiefs 35–10. **Drive: 6 plays, 54 yards, 0:34.**

**Third quarter**

- SF – Marquise Goodwin 11-yard pass from Jimmy Garoppolo (kick failed), 8:59. Chiefs 35–16. **Drive: 7 plays, 87 yards, 2:37.**
- SF – Alfred Morris 3-yard run (Jimmy Garoppolo-George Kittle pass), 2:43. Chiefs 35–24. **Drive: 11 plays, 77 yards, 5:12.**

**Fourth quarter**

- KC – Harrison Butker 37-yard field goal, 13:47. Chiefs 38–24. **Drive: 9 plays, 56 yards, 3:56.**
- SF – Robbie Gould 35-yard field goal, 5:17. Chiefs 38–27. **Drive: 17 plays, 58 yards, 8:30.**

**Top passers**

- SF – Jimmy Garoppolo – 20/30, 251 yards, 2 TD
- KC – Patrick Mahomes – 24/38, 314 yards, 3 TD

**Top rushers**

- SF – Matt Breida – 10 carries, 90 yards
- KC – Kareem Hunt – 18 carries, 44 yards, 2 TD

**Top receivers**

- SF – George Kittle – 5 receptions, 79 yards
- KC – Travis Kelce – 8 receptions, 114 yards

Not only did the 49ers lose the game, Jimmy Garoppolo got carted off in the fourth quarter with a serious knee injury. The next day, an MRI further revealed that Garoppolo had torn his ACL, ruling him out for the rest of the season. The devastating loss dropped the 49ers to 1-2 on the season.

These two teams would meet again the following season in Super Bowl LIV, with the 49ers falling short 31–20.

==== Week 4: at Los Angeles Chargers ====
Week Four: San Francisco 49ers at Los Angeles Chargers – Game summary

Quarter	1	2	3	4	Total
49ers	14	3	7	3	**27**
**Chargers**	6	11	9	3	**29**

at StubHub Center, Carson, California

- Date: September 30
- Game time: 1:25 pm. PDT
- Game weather: 78 °F (26 °C), sunny
- Game attendance: 25,397
- Referee: Ronald Torbert
- TV announcers (CBS): Andrew Catalon and James Lofton
- Recap

Game information

**First quarter**

- SF – Antone Exum 32-yard interception return (Robbie Gould kick), 14:03. 49ers 7–0.
- SF – Kendrick Bourne 2-yard pass from C. J. Beathard (Robbie Gould kick), 3:53. 49ers 14–0. **Drive: 6 plays, 56 yards, 3:08.**
- LAC – Antonio Gates 5-yard pass from Philip Rivers (kick failed), 0:43. 49ers 14–6. **Drive: 7 plays, 75 yards, 3:10.**

**Second quarter**

- SF – Robbie Gould 21-yard field goal, 4:59. 49ers 17–6. **Drive: 21 plays, 72 yards, 10:44.**
- LAC – Austin Ekeler 22-yard pass from Philip Rivers (Philip Rivers-Melvin Gordon pass), 0:47. 49ers 17–14. **Drive: 9 plays, 75 yards, 4:12.**
- LAC – Caleb Sturgis 48-yard field goal, 0:00. Tied 17–17. **Drive: 3 plays, 2 yards, 0:13.**

**Third quarter**

- LAC – Melvin Gordon 6-yard pass from Philip Rivers (kick failed), 10:35. Chargers 23–17. **Drive: 6 plays, 51 yards, 2:48.**
- LAC – Caleb Sturgis 25-yard field goal, 7:44. Chargers 26–17. **Drive: 4 plays, 5 yards, 0:58.**
- SF – George Kittle 82-yard pass from C. J. Beathard (Robbie Gould kick), 2:50. Chargers 26–24. **Drive: 2 plays, 84 yards, 0:47.**

**Fourth quarter**

- SF – Robbie Gould 33-yard field goal, 12:39. 49ers 27–26. **Drive: 9 plays, 49 yards, 3:28.**
- LAC – Caleb Sturgis 21-yard field goal, 7:41. Chargers 29–27. **Drive: 9 plays, 72 yards, 4:58.**

**Top passers**

- SF – C. J. Beathard – 23/37, 298 yards, 2 TD, 2 INT
- LAC – Philip Rivers – 25/39, 250 yards, 3 TD, 1 INT

**Top rushers**

- SF – Matt Breida – 9 carries, 39 yards
- LAC – Melvin Gordon – 15 carries, 104 yards

**Top receivers**

- SF – George Kittle – 6 receptions, 125 yards, 1 TD
- LAC – Keenan Allen – 7 receptions, 63 yards

The first post-Garoppolo game of the season was a surprisingly competitive game, mostly due to safety Antone Exum getting a pick-six in the first quarter, but the 49ers still lost 29–27 and dropped to 1–3 on the season and 0–1 after Garoppolo's injury.

==== Week 5: vs. Arizona Cardinals ====
Week Five: Arizona Cardinals at San Francisco 49ers – Game summary

Quarter	1	2	3	4	Total
**Cardinals**	7	7	0	14	**28**
49ers	6	0	0	12	**18**

at Levi's Stadium, Santa Clara, California

- Date: October 7
- Game time: 1:25 pm. PDT
- Game weather: 79 °F (26 °C), clear
- Game attendance: 68,337
- Referee: Shawn Smith
- TV announcers (Fox): Dick Stockton, Mark Schlereth and Jennifer Hale
- Recap

Game information

**First quarter**

- SF – Matt Breida 5-yard pass from C. J. Beathard (two-point conversion failed), 9:49. 49ers 6–0. **Drive: 8 plays, 75 yards, 5:11.**
- ARI – Christian Kirk 75-yard pass from Josh Rosen (Phil Dawson kick), 9:39. Cardinals 7–6. **Drive: 1 play, 75 yards, 0:10.**

**Second quarter**

- ARI – David Johnson 2-yard run (Phil Dawson kick), 11:00. Cardinals 14–6. **Drive: 4 plays, 18 yards, 2:18.**

**Third quarter**

- No scoring plays

**Fourth quarter**

- SF – Trent Taylor 1-yard pass from C. J. Beathard (two-point conversion failed), 6:51. Cardinals 14–12. **14 plays, 83 yards, 5:46.**
- ARI – Josh Bynes 23-yard fumble return (Phil Dawson kick), 4:33. Cardinals 21–12.
- ARI – David Johnson 6-yard run (Phil Dawson kick), 3:21. Cardinals 28–12. **Drive: 5 plays, 26 yards, 0:27.**
- SF – C. J. Beathard 1-yard run (two-point conversion failed), 1:29. Cardinals 28–18. **Drive: 10 plays, 76 yards, 1:52.**

**Top passers**

- ARI – Josh Rosen – 10/25, 170 yards, TD
- SF – C. J. Beathard – 34/54, 349 yards, 2 TD, 2 INT

**Top rushers**

- ARI – David Johnson – 18 carries, 55 yards, 2 TD
- SF – Alfred Morris – 18 carries, 61 yards

**Top receivers**

- ARI – Christian Kirk – 3 receptions, 85 yards, TD
- SF – George Kittle – 5 receptions, 83 yards

Playing a winless Cardinals team desperately seeking a win, the 49ers held rookie quarterback Josh Rosen in check, but were hurt by five offensive turnovers, one of which resulted in a defensive touchdown for Arizona. The 49ers dropped to 1–4 (0–2 since Garoppolo's injury) heading into a Monday Night road game against the Packers.

==== Week 6: at Green Bay Packers ====
Week Six: San Francisco 49ers at Green Bay Packers – Game summary

Quarter	1	2	3	4	Total
49ers	14	10	3	3	**30**
**Packers**	17	3	3	10	**33**

at Lambeau Field, Green Bay, Wisconsin

- Date: October 15
- Game time: 7:15 pm. CDT/5:15 pm. PDT
- Game weather: 37 °F (3 °C), clear
- Game attendance: 77,642
- Referee: John Parry
- TV announcers (ESPN/KGO): Joe Tessitore, Jason Witten, Booger McFarland and Lisa Salters
- Recap

Game information

First quarter

- SF – Matt Breida 3-yard run (Robbie Gould kick), 11:04. 49ers 7–0. **Drive: 7 plays, 75 yards, 4:01.**
- GB – Ty Montgomery 2-yard run (Mason Crosby kick), 9:20. Tied 7–7. **Drive: 4 plays, 77 yards, 1:42.**
- GB – Mason Crosby 29-yard field goal, 7:42. Packers 10–7. **Drive: 5 plays, 23 yards, 1:29.**
- GB – Davante Adams 9-yard pass from Aaron Rodgers (Mason Crosby kick), 2:02. Packers 17–7. **Drive: 5 plays, 79 yards, 2:54.**
- SF – Marquise Goodwin 67-yard pass from C. J. Beathard (Robbie Gould kick), 0:36. Packers 17–14. **Drive: 3 plays, 78 yards, 1:31.**

Second quarter

- GB – Mason Crosby 39-yard field goal, 7:38. Packers 20–14. **Drive: 9 plays, 23 yards, 4:38.**
- SF – Marquise Goodwin 30-yard pass from C. J. Beathard (Robbie Gould kick), 6:13. 49ers 21–20. **Drive: 3 plays, 65 yards, 1:29.**
- SF – Robbie Gould 39-yard field goal, 0:04. 49ers 24–20. **Drive: 11 plays, 32 yards, 5:07.**

Third quarter

- GB – Mason Crosby 51-yard field goal, 11:21. 49ers 24–23. **Drive: 7 plays, 42 yards, 3:43.**
- SF – Robbie Gould 44-yard field goal, 7:04. 49ers 27–23. **Drive: 9 plays, 49 yards, 4:18.**

Fourth quarter

- SF – Robbie Gould 43-yard field goal, 13:12. 49ers 30–23. **Drive: 10 plays, 58 yards, 5:12.**
- GB – Davante Adams 16-yard pass from Aaron Rodgers (Mason Crosby kick), 2:00. Tied 30–30. **Drive: 4 plays, 58 yards, 1:05.**
- GB – Mason Crosby 27-yard field goal, 0:03. Packers 33–30. **Drive: 10 plays, 81 yards, 1:07.**

Top passers

- SF – C. J. Beathard – 16/23, 245 yards, 2 TD, INT
- GB – Aaron Rodgers – 25/46, 425 yards, 2 TD

Top rushers

- SF – Raheem Mostert – 12 rushes, 87 yards
- GB – Aaron Jones – 8 rushes, 41 yards

Top receivers

- SF – Marquise Goodwin – 4 receptions, 126 yards, 2 TD
- GB – Davante Adams – 10 receptions, 132 yards, 2 TD

The 49ers held a 30–23 lead in the final three minutes, but Aaron Rodgers threw a touchdown pass to Davante Adams to tie the game with less than 2 minutes left. On the 49ers' next drive, a critical C. J. Beathard interception plus an illegal contact penalty on Richard Sherman in the final minute led to a 27-yard game-winning field goal by Mason Crosby to send the 49ers to a 33–30 loss and a 1–5 record heading into next week's home game against the undefeated Rams.

==== Week 7: vs. Los Angeles Rams ====
Week Seven: Los Angeles Rams at San Francisco 49ers – Game summary

Quarter	1	2	3	4	Total
**Rams**	3	19	10	7	**39**
49ers	0	7	3	0	**10**

at Levi's Stadium, Santa Clara, California

- Date: October 21
- Game time: 1:25 pm. PDT
- Game weather: 62 °F (17 °C), clear
- Game attendance: 66,597
- Referee: Walt Anderson
- TV announcers (CBS): Kevin Harlan, Rich Gannon and Steve Tasker
- Recap

Game information

**First quarter**

- LAR – Greg Zuerlein 35-yard field goal, 6:34. Rams 3–0. **Drive: 7 plays, 27 yards, 3:24.**

**Second quarter**

- LAR – Todd Gurley 7-yard run (Greg Zuerlein kick), 14:23. Rams 10–0. **Drive: 4 plays, 21 yards, 1:37.**
- LAR – Punt blocked by Cory Littleton out of bounds in end zone for a safety, 12:59. Rams 12–0.
- LAR – Greg Zuerlein 37-yard field goal, 10:05. Rams 15–0. **Drive: 5 plays, 34 yards, 2:54.**
- LAR – Brandin Cooks 19-yard pass from Jared Goff (Greg Zuerlein kick), 2:30. Rams 22–0. **Drive: 8 plays, 60 yards, 3:47.**
- SF – George Kittle 10-yard pass from C. J. Beathard (Robbie Gould kick), 0:13. Rams 22–7. **Drive: 8 plays, 75 yards, 2:17.**

**Third quarter**

- LAR – Greg Zuerlein 33-yard field goal, 8:06. Rams 25–7. **Drive: 11 plays, 60 yards, 4:46.**
- LAR – Todd Gurley 1-yard run (Greg Zuerlein kick), 6:04. Rams 32–7. **Drive: 3 plays, 27 yards, 0:55.**
- SF – Robbie Gould 51-yard field goal, 2:37. Rams 32–10. **Drive: 8 plays, 42 yards, 3:27.**

**Fourth quarter**

- LAR – Todd Gurley 12-yard pass from Jared Goff (Greg Zuerlein kick), 11:35. Rams 39–10. **Drive: 2 plays, 13 yards, 0:38.**

**Top passers**

- LAR – Jared Goff – 18/24, 202 yards, 2 TD
- SF – C. J. Beathard – 15/27, 170 yards, 1 TD, 2 INT

**Top rushers**

- LAR – Malcolm Brown – 13 carries, 65 yards
- SF – Raheem Mostert – 7 carries, 59 yards

**Top receivers**

- LAR – Robert Woods – 5 receptions, 78 yards
- SF – George Kittle – 5 receptions, 98 yards, 1 TD

The loss to their NFC West and interstate rivals had the 49ers fall to 1-6 and 0-3 since Jimmy Garoppolo's injury. The 29-point margin was the 49ers' worst loss until Week 12 of the 2024 season.

==== Week 8: at Arizona Cardinals ====
Week Eight: San Francisco 49ers at Arizona Cardinals – Game summary

Quarter	1	2	3	4	Total
49ers	2	3	7	3	**15**
**Cardinals**	0	3	0	15	**18**

at State Farm Stadium, Glendale, Arizona

- Date: October 28
- Game time: 1:25 p.m. MST & PDT
- Game weather: Played indoors (retractable roof closed)
- Game attendance: 61,923
- Referee: Brad Allen
- TV announcers (Fox): Dick Stockton, Mark Schlereth and Jennifer Hale
- Recap

Game information

**First quarter**

- SF – Penalty on Josh Rosen enforced in ARI end zone for a safety, 4:17. 49ers 2–0.

**Second quarter**

- ARI – Phil Dawson 31-yard field goal, 10:27. Cardinals 3–2. **Drive: 12 plays, 78 yards, 6:33.**
- SF – Robbie Gould 27-yard field goal, 4:36. 49ers 5–3. **Drive: 4 plays, 3 yards, 1:41.**

**Third quarter**

- SF – Marquise Goodwin 55-yard pass from C. J. Beathard (Robbie Gould kick), 6:32. 49ers 12–3. **Drive: 6 plays, 70 yards, 1:34.**

**Fourth quarter**

- SF – Robbie Gould 20-yard field goal, 13:37. 49ers 15–3. **Drive: 11 plays, 73 yards, 6:14.**
- ARI – Larry Fitzgerald 13-yard pass from Josh Rosen (Phil Dawson kick), 11:11. 49ers 15–10. **Drive: 6 plays, 75 yards, 2:27.**
- ARI – Christian Kirk 9-yard pass from Josh Rosen (Josh Rosen-Larry Fitzgerald pass), 0:39. Cardinals 18–15. **Drive: 12 plays, 73 yards, 1:42.**

**Top passers**

- SF – C. J. Beathard – 14/28, 190 yards, TD
- ARI – Josh Rosen – 23/40, 252 yards, 2 TD, INT

**Top rushers**

- SF – Matt Breida – 16 rushes, 42 yards
- ARI – David Johnson – 16 rushes, 59 yards

**Top receivers**

- SF – Kendrick Bourne – 7 receptions, 71 yards
- ARI – Larry Fitzgerald – 8 receptions, 102 yards, TD

With the loss, the 49ers dropped to 1–7 and last place in the NFC West. They were also swept by the Cardinals for the 4th consecutive season.

==== Week 9: vs. Oakland Raiders ====
Week Nine: Oakland Raiders at San Francisco 49ers – Game summary

Quarter	1	2	3	4	Total
Raiders	3	0	0	0	**3**
**49ers**	7	10	14	3	**34**

at Levi's Stadium, Santa Clara, California

- Date: November 1
- Game time: 5:20 pm. PDT
- Game weather: 82 °F (28 °C), clear
- Game attendance: 69,592
- Referee: Carl Cheffers
- TV announcers (Fox/NFLN): Joe Buck, Troy Aikman, Erin Andrews and Kristina Pink
- Recap

Game information

**First quarter**

- OAK – Daniel Carlson 37-yard field goal, 9:30. Raiders 3–0. **Drive: 10 plays, 56 yards, 5:30.**
- SF – Pierre Garçon 24-yard pass from Nick Mullens (Robbie Gould kick), 6:47. 49ers 7–3. **Drive: 6 plays, 75 yards, 2:43.**

**Second quarter**

- SF – Kendrick Bourne 4-yard pass from Nick Mullens (Robbie Gould kick), 12:40. 49ers 14–3. **Drive: 13 plays, 66 yards, 7:24.**
- SF – Robbie Gould 39-yard field goal, 0:16. 49ers 17–3. **Drive: 7 plays, 59 yards, 1:38.**

**Third quarter**

- SF – George Kittle 5-yard pass from Nick Mullens (Robbie Gould kick), 12:36. 49ers 24–3. **Drive: 4 plays, 75 yards, 2:24.**
- SF – Raheem Mostert 52-yard run (Robbie Gould kick), 9:17. 49ers 31–3. **Drive: 3 plays, 68 yards, 1:16.**

**Fourth quarter**

- SF – Robbie Gould 25-yard field goal, 3:59. 49ers 34–3. **Drive: 8 plays, 22 yards, 5:32.**

**Top passers**

- OAK – Derek Carr – 16/21, 171 yards
- SF – Nick Mullens – 16/22, 262 yards, 3 TD

**Top rushers**

- OAK – Doug Martin – 11 carries, 49 yards
- SF – Raheem Mostert – 7 carries, 86 yards, TD

**Top receivers**

- OAK – Jalen Richard – 4 receptions, 45 yards
- SF – George Kittle – 4 receptions, 108 yards, TD

This was the first start for Nick Mullens at quarterback, who replaced C. J. Beathard. The game was incredibly one-sided, with the 49ers winning by over 30 points. The win was the final Battle of the Bay tying up the overall series at 5 but the victory put the 49ers at 2-7 for the season.

==== Week 10: vs. New York Giants ====
Week Ten: New York Giants at San Francisco 49ers – Game summary

Quarter	1	2	3	4	Total
**Giants**	7	3	10	7	**27**
49ers	3	10	7	3	**23**

at Levi's Stadium, Santa Clara, California

- Date: November 12
- Game time: 5:15 pm. PST
- Game weather: 62 °F (17 °C), hazy
- Game attendance: 69,409
- Referee: Shawn Hochuli
- TV announcers (ESPN/KGO): Joe Tessitore, Jason Witten, Booger McFarland, and Lisa Salters
- Recap

Game information

**First quarter**

- SF – Robbie Gould 53-yard field goal, 10:13. 49ers 3–0. **Drive: 6 plays, 19 yards, 3:19.**
- NYG – Odell Beckham Jr. 10-yard pass from Eli Manning (Aldrick Rosas kick), 2:43. Giants 7–3. **Drive: 3 plays, 12 yards, 1:20.**

**Second quarter**

- SF – Matt Breida 3-yard run (Robbie Gould kick), 13:05. 49ers 10–7. **Drive: 7 plays, 65 yards, 4:38.**
- NYG – Aldrick Rosas 20-yard field goal, 1:50. Tied 10–10. **Drive: 14 plays, 55 yards, 6:45.**
- SF – Robbie Gould 36-yard field goal, 0:02. 49ers 13–10. **Drive: 11 plays, 52 yards, 1:48.**

**Third quarter**

- SF – Matt Breida 11-yard pass from Nick Mullens (Robbie Gould kick), 8:09. 49ers 20–10. **Drive: 11 plays, 65 yards, 6:51.**
- NYG – Odell Beckham Jr. 20-yard pass from Eli Manning (Aldrick Rosas kick), 6:36. 49ers 20–17. **Drive: 4 plays, 53 yards, 1:33.**
- NYG – Aldrick Rosas 31-yard field goal, 2:10. Tied 20–20. **Drive: 5 plays, 34 yards, 2:05.**

**Fourth quarter**

- SF – Robbie Gould 30-yard field goal, 2:46. 49ers 23–20. **Drive: 11 plays, 54 yards, 6:11.**
- NYG – Sterling Shepard 3-yard pass from Eli Manning (Aldrick Rosas kick), 0:53. Giants 27–23. **Drive: 9 plays, 69 yards, 1:53.**

**Top passers**

- NYG – Eli Manning – 19/31, 188 yards, 3 TD
- SF – Nick Mullens – 27/39, 250 yards, TD, 2 INT

**Top rushers**

- NYG – Saquon Barkley – 20 carries, 67 yards
- SF – Matt Breida – 17 carries, 101 yards, TD

**Top receivers**

- NYG – Odell Beckham Jr. – 4 receptions, 73 yards, 2 TD
- SF – George Kittle – 9 receptions, 83 yards

With the loss, the 49ers fall to 2-8 this would secure their 5th consecutive season without a winning record.

==== Week 12: at Tampa Bay Buccaneers ====
Week Twelve: San Francisco 49ers at Tampa Bay Buccaneers – Game summary

Quarter	1	2	3	4	Total
49ers	0	6	3	0	**9**
**Buccaneers**	7	6	7	7	**27**

at Raymond James Stadium, Tampa, Florida

- Date: November 25
- Game time: 1:00 p.m. EST/10:00 am. PST
- Game weather: 77 °F (25 °C), cloudy
- Game attendance: 50,436
- Referee: John Parry
- TV announcers (Fox): Kenny Albert, Ronde Barber and Jennifer Hale
- Recap

Game information

First quarter

- TB – Cameron Brate 6-yard pass from Jameis Winston (Cairo Santos kick), 8:21. Buccaneers 7–0. **Drive: 7 plays, 73 yards, 3:50.**

Second quarter

- SF – Dante Pettis 13-yard pass from Nick Mullens (kick failed), 8:32. Buccaneers 7–6. **Drive: 9 plays, 79 yards, 5:42.**
- TB – Cairo Santos 41-yard field goal, 3:21. Buccaneers 10–6. **Drive: 12 plays, 53 yards, 5:11.**
- TB – Cairo Santos 39-yard field goal, 0:06. Buccaneers 13–6. **Drive: 8 plays, 38 yards, 1:37.**

Third quarter

- SF – Robbie Gould 23-yard field goal, 11:02. Buccaneers 13–9. **Drive: 10 plays, 78 yards, 3:58.**

Fourth quarter

- TB – Peyton Barber 2-yard rush (Cairo Santos kick), 8:25. Buccaneers 20–9. **Drive: 6 plays, 75 yards, 2:37.**
- TB – Adam Humphries 28-yard pass from Jameis Winston (Cairo Santos kick), 14:10. Buccaneers 27–9. **Drive: 10 plays, 85 yards, 5:00.**

**Top passers**

- SF – Nick Mullens – 18/32, 221 yards, 1 TD, 2 INT
- TB – Jameis Winston – 29/38, 312 yards, 2 TD

**Top rushers**

- SF – Matt Breida – 14 carries, 106 yards
- TB – Peyton Barber – 18 carries, 47 yards, 1 TD

**Top receivers**

- SF – Dante Pettis – 4 receptions, 77 yards, 1 TD
- TB – Mike Evans – 6 receptions, 116 yards

With the loss, the 49ers fall to 2-9, securing their 4th consecutive losing season.

==== Week 13: at Seattle Seahawks ====
Week Thirteen: San Francisco 49ers at Seattle Seahawks – Game summary

Quarter	1	2	3	4	Total
49ers	0	3	7	6	**16**
**Seahawks**	6	14	7	16	**43**

at CenturyLink Field, Seattle, Washington

- Date: December 2
- Game time: 1:25 pm. PST
- Game weather: 45 °F (7 °C), cloudy
- Game attendance: 69,009
- Referee: Clete Blakeman
- TV announcers (Fox): Dick Stockton, Mark Schlereth and Jennifer Hale
- Recap

Game information

**First quarter**

- SEA – Jaron Brown 4-yard pass from Russell Wilson (kick failed), 1:25. Seahawks 6–0. **Drive: 7 plays, 74 yards, 4:23.**

**Second quarter**

- SEA – Tyler Lockett 52-yard pass from Russell Wilson (Sebastian Janikowski kick), 13:41. Seahawks 13–0. **Drive: 2 plays, 57 yards, 1:12.**
- SEA – Doug Baldwin 1-yard pass from Russell Wilson (Sebastian Janikowski kick), 1:17. Seahawks 20–0. **Drive: 5 plays, 33 yards, 0:34.**
- SF – Robbie Gould 45-yard field goal, 0:00. Seahawks 20–3. **Drive: 7 plays, 30 yards, 1:17.**

**Third quarter**

- SEA – Rashaad Penny 20-yard rush (Sebastian Janikowski kick), 14:44. Seahawks 27–3. **Drive: 1 plays, 20 yards, 0:16.**
- SF – Dante Pettis 17-yard pass from Nick Mullens (Robbie Gould kick), 11:24. Seahawks 27–10. **Drive: 7 plays, 58 yards, 3:20.**

**Fourth quarter**

- SEA – Jaron Brown 18-yard pass from Russell Wilson (Sebastian Janikowski kick), 14:17. Seahawks 34–10. **Drive: 6 plays, 88 yards, 3:23.**
- SF – Dante Pettis 75-yard pass from Nick Mullens (run failed), 14:06. Seahawks 34–16. **Drive: 1 plays, 75 yards, 0:11.**
- SEA – Sebastian Janikowski 40-yard field goal, 7:46. Seahawks 37–16. **Drive: 11 plays, 53 yards, 6:20.**
- SEA – Bobby Wagner 98-yard interception return (kick failed), 4:04. Seahawks 43–16.

**Top passers**

- SF – Nick Mullens – 30/48, 414 yards, 2 TD, 1 INT
- SEA – Russell Wilson – 11/17, 185 yards, 4 TD

**Top rushers**

- SF – Jeff Wilson – 15 carries, 61 yards
- SEA – Chris Carson – 13 carries, 69 yards

**Top receivers**

- SF – Dante Pettis – 5 receptions, 129 yards, 2 TD
- SEA – Jaron Brown – 3 receptions, 67 yards, 2 TD

With the loss, the 49ers fall to 2-10 and 0-4 in the NFC West division.

==== Week 14: vs. Denver Broncos ====
Week Fourteen: Denver Broncos at San Francisco 49ers – Game summary

Quarter	1	2	3	4	Total
Broncos	0	0	7	7	**14**
**49ers**	3	17	0	0	**20**

at Levi's Stadium, Santa Clara, California

- Date: December 9
- Game time: 1:05 pm. PST
- Game weather: 54 °F (12 °C), overcast
- Game attendance: 69,449
- Referee: Shawn Smith
- TV announcers (CBS): Andrew Catalon and James Lofton
- Recap

Game information

**First quarter**

- SF – Robbie Gould 40-yard field goal, 10:23. 49ers 3–0. **Drive: 9 plays, 56 yards, 4:37.**

**Second quarter**

- SF – Robbie Gould 29-yard field goal, 13:01. 49ers 6–0. **Drive: 7 plays, 69 yards, 4:09.**
- SF – George Kittle 85-yard pass from Nick Mullens (Robbie Gould kick), 9:47. 49ers 13–0. **Drive: 1 play, 85 yards, 0:13.**
- SF – Dante Pettis 1-yard pass from Nick Mullens (Robbie Gould kick), 0:08. 49ers 20–0. **Drive: 7 plays, 72 yards, 0:59.**

**Third quarter**

- DEN – Phillip Lindsay 3-yard run (Brandon McManus kick), 6:05. 49ers 20–7. **Drive: 11 plays, 56 yards, 4:54.**

**Fourth quarter**

- DEN – DaeSean Hamilton 1-yard pass from Case Keenum (Brandon McManus kick), 3:53. 49ers 20–14. **Drive: 14 plays, 69 yards, 3:02.**

**Top passers**

- DEN – Case Keenum – 24/42, 186 yards, TD
- SF – Nick Mullens – 20/33, 332 yards, 2 TD, INT

**Top rushers**

- DEN – Royce Freeman – 6 rushes, 36 yards
- SF – Jeff Wilson – 23 rushes, 90 yards

**Top receivers**

- DEN – Tim Patrick – 7 receptions, 85 yards
- SF – George Kittle – 7 receptions, 210 yards, TD

With the victory, the 49ers snapped a 3 game losing streak and go up to 3-10 on the season.

==== Week 15: vs. Seattle Seahawks ====
Week Fifteen: Seattle Seahawks at San Francisco 49ers – Game summary

Quarter	1	2	3	4	OT	Total
Seahawks	6	7	0	10	0	**23**
**49ers**	7	10	3	3	3	**26**

at Levi's Stadium, Santa Clara, California

- Date: December 16
- Game time: 1:05 pm. PST
- Game weather: 61 °F (16 °C), cloudy
- Game attendance: 68,836
- Referee: Pete Morelli
- TV announcers (Fox): Thom Brennaman, Chris Spielman and Shannon Spake
- Recap

Game information

**First quarter**

- SEA – Doug Baldwin 5-yard pass from Russell Wilson (kick failed), 9:27. Seahawks 6–0. **Drive: 9 plays, 59 yards, 4:05.**
- SF – Richie James 97-yard kickoff return (Robbie Gould kick), 9:15. 49ers 7–6.

**Second quarter**

- SF – Garrett Celek 41-yard pass from Nick Mullens (Robbie Gould kick), 9:29. 49ers 14–6. **Drive: 10 plays, 98 yards, 5:22.**
- SEA – Doug Baldwin 35-yard pass from Russell Wilson (Sebastian Janikowski kick), 5:19. 49ers 14–13. **Drive: 8 plays, 79 yards, 4:10.**
- SF – Robbie Gould 28-yard field goal, 1:05. 49ers 17–13. **Drive: 9 plays, 66 yards, 4:14.**

**Third quarter**

- SF – Robbie Gould 33-yard field goal, 2:54. 49ers 20–13. **Drive: 8 plays, 51 yards, 3:54.**

**Fourth quarter**

- SEA – Chris Carson 1-yard rush (Sebastian Janikowski kick), 13:51. Tied 20–20. **Drive: 10 plays, 75 yards, 4:03.**
- SF – Robbie Gould 45-yard field goal, 9:51. 49ers 23–20. **Drive: 7 plays, 48 yards, 4:00.**
- SEA – Sebastian Janikowski 48-yard field goal, 5:21. Tied 23–23. **Drive: 7 plays, 45 yards, 4:30.**

**Overtime**

- SF – Robbie Gould 36-yard field goal, 3:06. 49ers 26–23. **Drive: 7 plays, 44 yards, 4:19.**

**Top passers**

- SEA – Russell Wilson – 23/31, 237 yards, 2 TD
- SF – Nick Mullens – 20/29, 275 yards, TD

**Top rushers**

- SEA – Chris Carson – 22 carries, 119 yards, TD
- SF – Matt Breida – 17 carries, 50 yards

**Top receivers**

- SEA – Doug Baldwin – 4 receptions, 77 yards, 2 TD
- SF – Dante Pettis – 5 receptions, 83 yards

This was the first time since 2013 that the 49ers beat the Seahawks, snapping a 10-game losing streak which dates back to the 2013 NFC Championship Game. This also prevented the Seahawks from clinching a Wild-Card Berth that week. The win would be the final win of the season putting the 49ers at 4-10.

==== Week 16: vs. Chicago Bears ====
Week Sixteen: Chicago Bears at San Francisco 49ers – Game summary

Quarter	1	2	3	4	Total
**Bears**	0	7	7	0	**14**
49ers	0	9	0	0	**9**

at Levi's Stadium, Santa Clara, California

- Date: December 23
- Game time: 1:05 pm. PST
- Game weather: 50 °F (10 °C), partly cloudy
- Game attendance: 70,806
- Referee: Alex Kemp
- TV announcers (Fox): Thom Brennaman, Chris Spielman, and Shannon Spake
- Recap

Game information

**First quarter**

- No scoring plays.

**Second quarter**

- SF- Robbie Gould 33-yard field goal, 10:54. 49ers 3-0. **Drive: 12 plays, 48 yards, 6:26.**
- SF- Robbie Gould 30-yard field goal, 5:49. 49ers 6-0. **Drive: 7 plays, 14 yards, 3:00.**
- CHI- Anthony Miller 4-yard pass from Mitchell Trubisky (Cody Parkey kick), 1:52. Bears 7-6. **Drive: 8 plays, 75 yards, 3:57**
- SF- Robbie Gould 23-yard field goal, 0:00. 49ers 9-7. **Drive: 8 plays, 63 yards, 1:52.**

**Third quarter**

- CHI- Jordan Howard 2-yard run (Cody Parkey kick), 4:14. Bears 14-9. **Drive: 12 plays, 90 yards, 7:43.**

**Fourth quarter**

- No scoring plays.

**Top passers**

- CHI – Mitchell Trubisky - 25/29, 246 yards, 1 TD
- SF – Nick Mullens - 22/38, 241 yards, 1 INT

**Top rushers**

- CHI – Jordan Howard - 13 rushes, 53 yards, 1 TD
- SF – Jeff Wilson, Jr. - 11 rushes, 27 yards

**Top receivers**

- CHI – Allen Robinson - 6 receptions, 85 yards
- SF – George Kittle - 7 receptions, 74 yards

The 49ers fall in the Levi's season finale, dropping them to 4-11 on the season.

==== Week 17: at Los Angeles Rams ====
Week Seventeen: San Francisco 49ers at Los Angeles Rams – Game summary

Quarter	1	2	3	4	Total
49ers	3	7	7	15	**32**
**Rams**	14	17	14	3	**48**

at Los Angeles Memorial Coliseum, Los Angeles, California

- Date: December 30
- Game time: 1:25 pm. PST
- Game weather: 65 °F (18 °C), sunny
- Game attendance: 72,161
- Referee: Jerome Boger
- TV announcers (Fox): Thom Brennaman, Chris Spielman and Shannon Spake
- Recap

Game information

**First quarter**

- LAR – Brandin Cooks 3-yard pass from Jared Goff (Greg Zuerlein kick), 11:57. Rams 7–0. **Drive: 3 plays, 7 yards, 1:08.**
- LAR – C. J. Anderson 1-yard run (Greg Zuerlein kick), 10:42. Rams 14–0. **Drive: 2 plays, 13 yards, 0:19.**
- SF – Robbie Gould 30-yard field goal, 2:11. Rams 14–3. **Drive: 5 plays, 58 yards, 2:29.**

**Second quarter**

- LAR – Cory Littleton 19-yard interception return (Greg Zuerlein kick), 12:37. Rams 21–3.
- LAR – Brandin Cooks 18-yard pass from Jared Goff (Greg Zuerlein kick), 6:00. Rams 28–3. **Drive: 11 plays, 86 yards, 5:10.**
- SF – Richie James 9-yard pass from Nick Mullens (Robbie Gould kick), 2:07. Rams 28–10. **Drive: 8 plays, 75 yards, 3:53.**
- LAR – Greg Zuerlein 28-yard field goal, 0:00. Rams 31–10. **Drive: 13 plays, 65 yards, 2:07.**

**Third quarter**

- LAR – Josh Reynolds 29-yard pass from Jared Goff (Greg Zuerlein kick), 12:19. Rams 38–10. **Drive: 5 plays, 75 yards, 2:41.**
- SF – Alfred Morris 1-yard run (Greg Zuerlein kick), 8:23. Rams 38–17. **Drive: 8 plays, 75 yards, 3:56.**
- LAR – Josh Reynolds 2-yard pass from Jared Goff (Greg Zuerlein kick), 11:57. Rams 45–17. **Drive: 9 plays, 75 yards, 5:25.**

**Fourth quarter**

- LAR – Greg Zuerlein 51-yard field goal, 11:44. Rams 48–17. **Drive: 7 plays, 19 yards, 3:41.**
- SF – Kendrick Bourne 2-yard pass from Nick Mullens (Robbie Gould kick), 6:54. Rams 48–24. **Drive: 9 plays, 75 yards, 4:50.**
- SF – George Kittle 43-yard pass from Nick Mullens (Nick Mullens-Trent Taylor pass), 2:20. Rams 48–32. **Drive: 2 plays, 49 yards, 0:17.**

**Top passers**

- SF – Nick Mullens – 23/33, 282 yards, 3 TD, 3 INT
- LAR – Jared Goff – 15/26, 199 yards, 4 TD

**Top rushers**

- SF – Alfred Morris – 16 carries, 111 yards, TD
- LAR – C. J. Anderson – 23 carries, 132 yards, TD

**Top receivers**

- SF – George Kittle – 9 receptions, 149 yards, TD
- LAR – Brandin Cooks – 5 receptions, 62 yards, 2 TD

With the loss, the 49ers finished 0–8 on the road for the first time since 1979. The 49ers were swept by the Rams for the first time since 2004. During the season finale against the Rams, Kittle broke Travis Kelce's single-season receiving yards record for a tight end, less than an hour after Kelce broke the record, on a 43-yard touchdown and finished the season with 1,377 yards. The 49ers would end their season at 4-12.

=== Standings ===
==== Division ====
NFC West
	W	L	T	PCT	DIV	CONF	PF	PA	STK
^{(2)} Los Angeles Rams	13	3	0	.813	6–0	9–3	527	384	W2
^{(5)} Seattle Seahawks	10	6	0	.625	3–3	8–4	428	347	W2
San Francisco 49ers	4	12	0	.250	1–5	2–10	342	435	L2
Arizona Cardinals	3	13	0	.188	2–4	3–9	225	425	L4

==== Conference ====
NFC
#	Team	Division	W	L	T	PCT	DIV	CONF	SOS	SOV	STK
**Division leaders**
1 (Note: New Orleans finished ahead of LA Rams based on head-to-head victory, claiming the No. 1 seed.)	New Orleans Saints	South	13	3	0	.813	4–2	9–3	.482	.488	L1
2	Los Angeles Rams	West	13	3	0	.813	6–0	9–3	.480	.428	W2
3	Chicago Bears	North	12	4	0	.750	5–1	10–2	.430	.419	W4
4	Dallas Cowboys	East	10	6	0	.625	5–1	9–3	.488	.444	W2
**Wild Cards**
5	Seattle Seahawks	West	10	6	0	.625	3–3	8–4	.484	.400	W2
6	Philadelphia Eagles	East	9	7	0	.563	4–2	6–6	.518	.486	W3
**Did not qualify for the postseason**
7	Minnesota Vikings	North	8	7	1	.531	3–2–1	6–5–1	.504	.355	L1
8 (Note: Atlanta finished ahead of Washington based on head-to-head victory. Atlanta finished ahead of Carolina based on head-to-head sweep. Washington finished ahead of Carolina based on head-to-head victory.)	Atlanta Falcons	South	7	9	0	.438	4–2	7–5	.482	.348	W3
9	Washington Redskins	East	7	9	0	.438	2–4	6–6	.486	.371	L2
10	Carolina Panthers	South	7	9	0	.438	2–4	5–7	.508	.518	W1
11	Green Bay Packers	North	6	9	1	.406	1–4–1	3–8–1	.488	.417	L1
12	Detroit Lions	North	6	10	0	.375	2–4	4–8	.504	.427	W1
13 (Note: NY Giants finished ahead of Tampa Bay based on head-to-head victory.)	New York Giants	East	5	11	0	.313	1–5	4–8	.527	.487	L3
14	Tampa Bay Buccaneers	South	5	11	0	.313	2–4	4–8	.523	.506	L4
15	San Francisco 49ers	West	4	12	0	.250	1–5	2–10	.504	.406	L2
16	Arizona Cardinals	West	3	13	0	.188	2–4	3–9	.527	.302	L4
**Tiebreakers** (Note: When breaking ties for three or more teams under the NFL's rules, they are first broken within divisions, then comparing only the highest-ranked remaining team from each division.)
