= Kolton Miller =

American football player (born 1995)

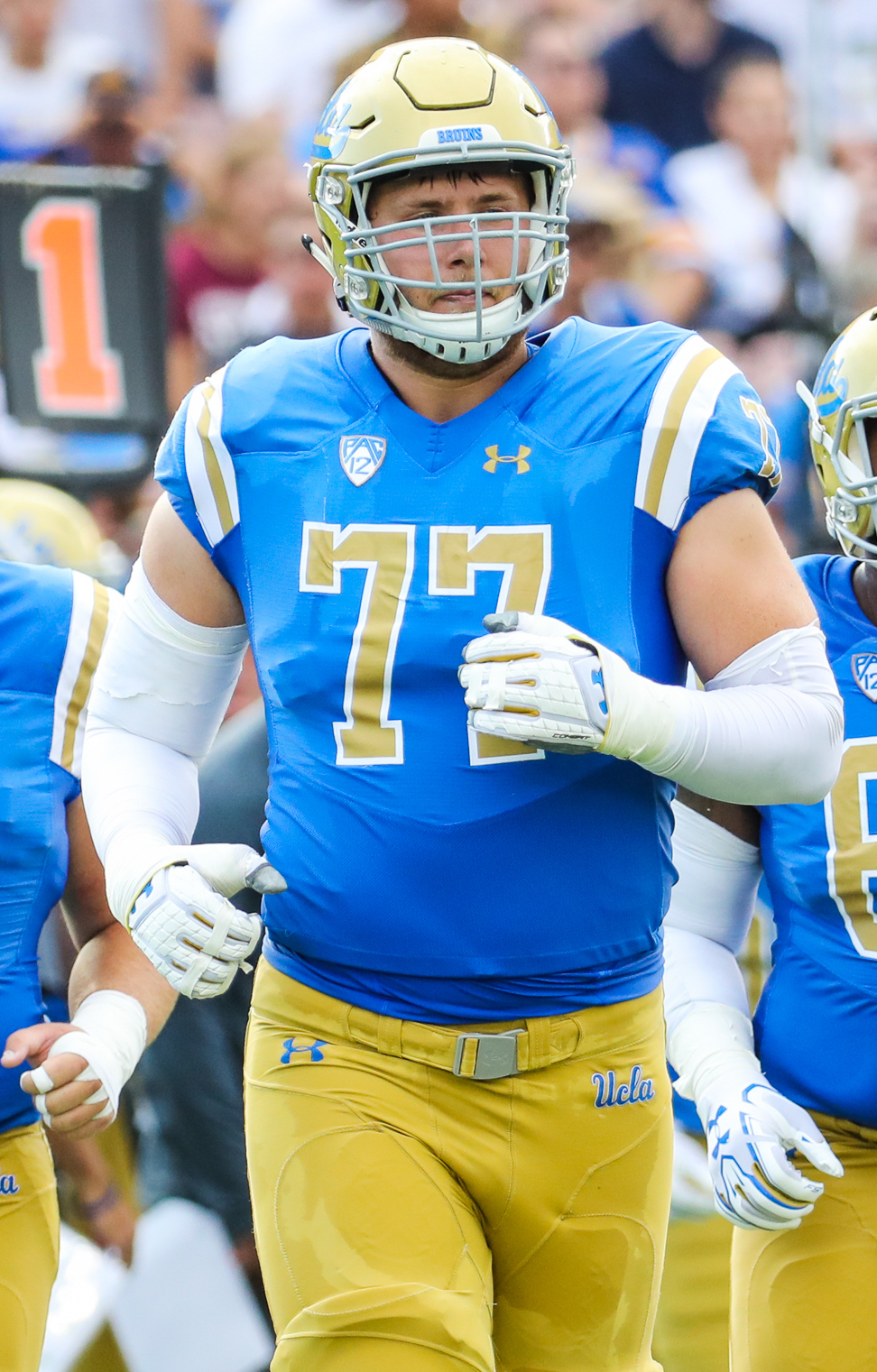
- Miller with the UCLA Bruins in 2017

No. 74 – Las Vegas Raiders
- Position: Offensive tackle
- Roster status: Active

Personal information
- Born: October 9, 1995 (age 31); Redwood City, California, U.S.
- Listed height: 6 ft 8 in (2.03 m)
- Listed weight: 326 lb (148 kg)

Career information
- High school: Roseville (Roseville, California)
- College: UCLA (2014–2017)
- NFL draft: 2018: 1st round, 15th overall pick

Career history
- Oakland / Las Vegas Raiders (2018–present)

Awards and highlights
- Second-team All-Pac-12 (2017)

Career NFL statistics as of 2025
- Games played: 113
- Games started: 111
- Stats at Pro Football Reference

Kolton Daniel Miller (born October 9, 1995) is an American professional football offensive tackle for the Las Vegas Raiders of the National Football League (NFL). He played college football for the UCLA Bruins.

== Early life ==
Miller was born the oldest of two children to Karrie and Dan Miller. Born in Redwood City, California, Miller attended high school in Roseville, California where he played tackle and defensive tackle positions with the Roseville Tigers. Rated a four-star recruiting prospect, Miller was ranked the 31st offensive tackle in the nation and 35th offensive lineman prospect in the state. He received numerous collegiate offers including Wyoming, Washington State, Washington, Texas Tech, San Jose State, San Diego State, Oregon, Nevada, Arizona State, Nebraska, Fresno State, California, Arizona, Oregon State, Wisconsin and the University of California, Los Angeles (UCLA).

== College career ==
After redshirting in 2014, Miller made his first career start at UCLA in 2015 after Conor McDermott was injured against California. Miller took over as starting tackle for UCLA from that game on. He later started the first five games of the 2016 season, but was injured against Arizona and was out for the rest of the season. After the 2017 season, Miller announced that he would declare for the 2018 NFL draft. While at UCLA, Miller made the Athletic Director's academic honor roll for the Fall 2014, Winter 2015, Spring 2015 semesters. He majored in political science.

== Professional career ==
At the NFL Combine, Miller set a combine record for an offensive lineman with a 10'1" broad jump.

Pre-draft measurables
Height	Weight	Arm length	Hand span	Wingspan	40-yard dash	10-yard split	20-yard split	20-yard shuttle	Three-cone drill	Vertical jump	Broad jump	Bench press
6 ft 8 5/8 in (2.05 m)	309 lb (140 kg)	34 1/8 in (0.87 m)	10 3/4 in (0.27 m)	6 ft 10 1/2 in (2.10 m)	4.95 s	1.67 s	2.82 s	4.49 s	7.34 s	31.5 in (0.80 m)	10 ft 1 in (3.07 m)	24 reps
All values from NFL Combine

Miller was selected by the Oakland Raiders with the 15th overall pick in the first round of the 2018 NFL draft. On May 18, 2018, Miller signed a four-year rookie deal. He was named the Raiders starting left tackle to start the 2018 season, beating out veteran Donald Penn, who was moved to right tackle. In Week 5 against the Los Angeles Chargers, Miller allowed 3 sacks on quarterback Derek Carr in a 26–10 loss. In week 6 against the Seattle Seahawks, Miller allowed another three sacks on Carr. In Week 8 against the Indianapolis Colts, Miller and the offensive line bounced back and did not allow a single sack in the game.

Despite the signing of veteran Trent Brown, head coach Jon Gruden announced that Miller would remain at left tackle with Brown moving to right.

Miller was placed on the reserve/COVID-19 list by the team on October 22, 2020, and was activated two days later.

On April 2, 2021, Miller signed a three-year, $54.015 million contract extension with $42.6 million guaranteed with the Raiders, keeping him under contract through the 2025 season.

On July 30, 2025, Miller signed a three-year, $66 million contract extension with $42.5 million guaranteed with the Raiders, keep him under contract through the 2028 season. In Week 4 against the Chicago Bears, Miller suffered a hairline fracture and high ankle sprain after being hit by an attempted tackle on Ashton Jeanty from Bears lineman Tanoh Kpassagnon; he was placed on injured reserve on September 30.

== Personal life ==
Miller has a younger brother named Chad. He named Tedy Bruschi as his favorite athlete. Outside of football, Miller enjoys fishing and watching movies.

During June 2023, Miller hosted his first youth football camp assisted by Raiders teammates Josh Jacobs, Brandon Parker and Dylan Parham. The camp was held at Miller's high school in Roseville. He held his second football camp in July 2024 again at Roseville High, where it was attended by 360 children between ages 5 and 14.
