= Tarvarius Moore =

American football player (born 1996)

- Moore with the San Francisco 49ers in 2018

Profile
- Position: Safety

Personal information
- Born: August 16, 1996 (age 30); Shubuta, Mississippi, U.S.
- Listed height: 6 ft 1 in (1.85 m)
- Listed weight: 208 lb (94 kg)

Career information
- High school: Quitman (Quitman, Mississippi)
- College: Pearl River CC (2014–2015); Southern Miss (2016–2017)
- NFL draft: 2018: 3rd round, 95th overall pick

Career history
- San Francisco 49ers (2018–2022); Green Bay Packers (2023)*; Chicago Bears (2024)
- * Offseason or practice squad member only

Career NFL statistics as of 2024
- Total tackles: 115
- Forced fumbles: 2
- Fumble recoveries: 1
- Pass deflections: 6
- Stats at Pro Football Reference

Tarvarius Brennan Moore (born August 16, 1996) is an American professional football safety. He played college football for the Southern Miss Golden Eagles, and was selected by the San Francisco 49ers in the third round of the 2018 NFL draft.

== College career ==
Moore played two years at Pearl River Community College before transferring to the University of Southern Mississippi. Moore signed with Southern Miss over other schools including Arkansas State, Louisville, Middle Tennessee, Minnesota and Nebraska. Moore did not make any starts during his first year at Southern Miss, being fourth on the depth chart behind three seniors. Despite this, he played all 13 games and tied the team lead for interceptions with two. During his senior season, Moore became a starter and led the team in tackles and interceptions.

== Professional career ==
=== Pre-draft ===
Moore did not receive an invitation to attend the NFL Scouting Combine in Indianapolis. On March 29, 2018, he attended Southern Mississippi's pro day and performed all of the combine and positional drills. At the conclusion of the pre-draft process, Moore was projected to be a third round pick by NFL draft experts and scouts. He was ranked as the fourth best free safety prospect in the draft by DraftScout.com and was ranked the tenth best cornerback in the draft by Scouts Inc.

Pre-draft measurables
Height	Weight	Arm length	Hand span	40-yard dash	10-yard split	20-yard split	20-yard shuttle	Three-cone drill	Vertical jump	Broad jump	Bench press
6 ft 1 1/8 in (1.86 m)	199 lb (90 kg)	33 1/8 in (0.84 m)	9 in (0.23 m)	4.32 s	1.51 s	2.50 s	4.20 s	6.95 s	38.5 in (0.98 m)	11 ft 1 in (3.38 m)	7 reps
All values from Southern Miss' Pro Day

=== San Francisco 49ers ===
The San Francisco 49ers drafted Moore in the third round (95th overall) of the 2018 NFL draft. Moore was the tenth cornerback drafted in 2018. The pick used to draft Moore was traded from the New England Patriots in exchange for Trent Brown.

External videos
- 49ers draft Tarvarius Moore 95th overall

On May 5, 2018, the 49ers signed Moore to a four-year, $3.35 million contract that includes a signing bonus of $784,371.

In Super Bowl LIV against the Kansas City Chiefs, Moore recorded an interception off a pass thrown by Patrick Mahomes which was deflected off the arm of wide receiver Tyreek Hill during the 31–20 loss. In 2020, Moore played in all 16 games, and started 8.

In June 2021, Moore suffered a ruptured Achilles' tendon during practice. He was placed on the reserve/physically unable to perform list on August 31, 2021.

=== Green Bay Packers ===
On March 17, 2023, Moore signed with the Green Bay Packers. He was placed on injured reserve on August 29, then released on September 6.

=== Chicago Bears ===
On March 8, 2024, Moore signed with the Chicago Bears. He was released on August 27, and re-signed to the practice squad. He was promoted to the active roster on November 7.

On July 23, 2025, Moore was released by the Bears.

== NFL career statistics ==
=== Regular season ===
Year	Team	Games		Tackles				Interceptions						Fumbles	
Year	Team	GP	GS	Comb	Total	Ast	Sck	PD	Int	Yds	Avg	Lng	TDs	FF	FR
2018	SF	16	2	23	20	3	0.0	2	0	0	0.0	0	0	1	0
2019	SF	16	3	25	16	9	0.0	3	0	0	0.0	0	0	0	0
2020	SF	16	8	52	37	15	0.0	1	0	0	0.0	0	0	1	1
2022	SF	13	0	8	7	1	0.0	0	0	0	0.0	0	0	0	0
Career		61	13	108	80	28	0.0	6	0	0	0.0	0	0	2	1
Source: pro-football-reference.com

=== Postseason ===
Year	Team	Games		Tackles				Interceptions						Fumbles	
Year	Team	GP	GS	Comb	Total	Ast	Sck	PD	Int	Yds	Avg	Lng	TDs	FF	FR
2019	SF	3	0	2	2	0	0.0	2	1	7	7.0	7	0	0	0
2022	SF	3	0	2	1	1	0.0	0	0	0	0.0	0	0	0	0
Career		6	1	4	3	1	0.0	2	1	7	7.0	7	0	0	0
Source: pro-football-reference.com
