= Mike McGlinchey (offensive lineman) =

American football player (born 1995)

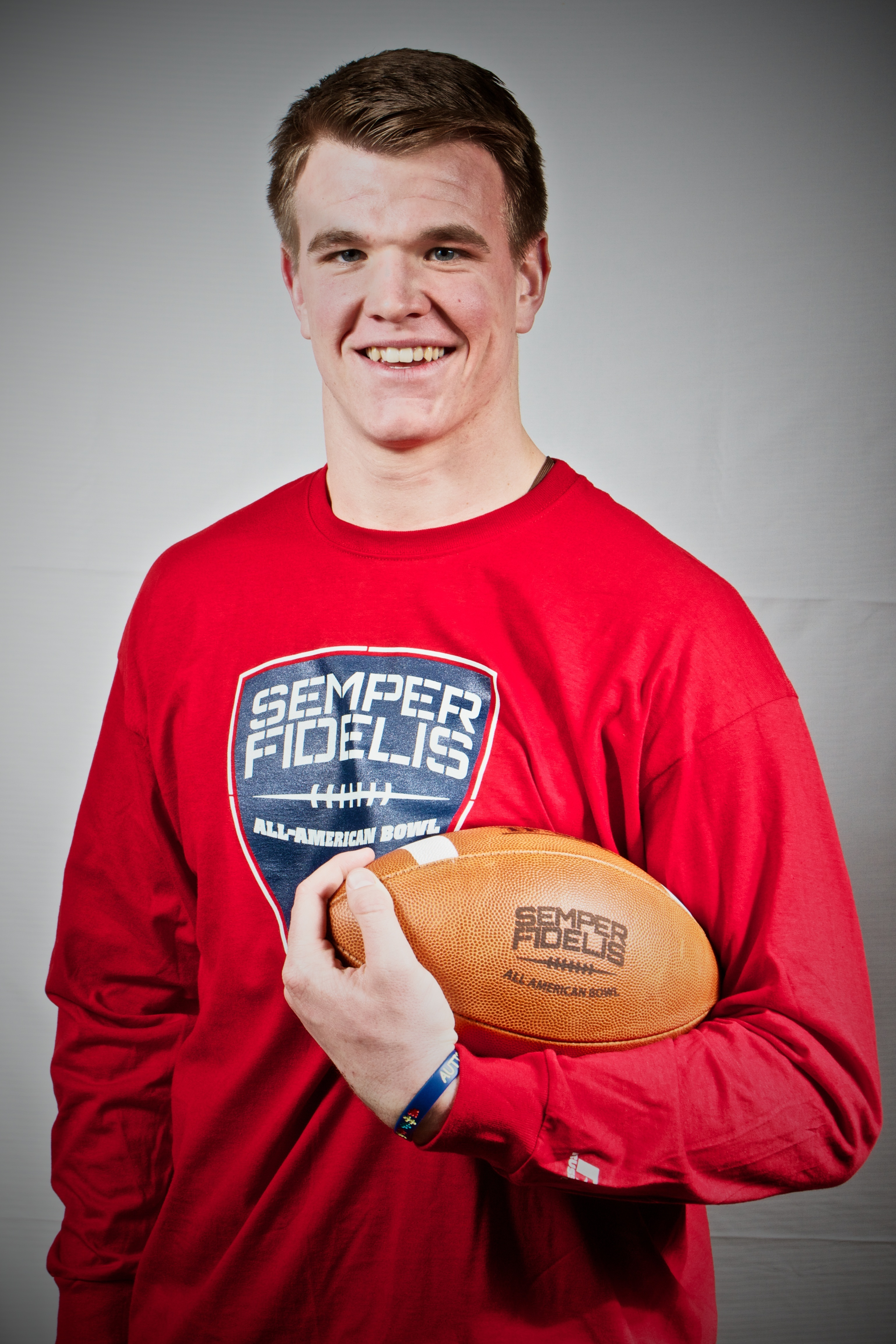
- McGlinchey in 2012

No. 69 – Denver Broncos
- Position: Offensive tackle
- Roster status: Active

Personal information
- Born: January 12, 1995 (age 31); Warrington, Pennsylvania, U.S.
- Listed height: 6 ft 8 in (2.03 m)
- Listed weight: 315 lb (143 kg)

Career information
- High school: William Penn Charter School (Philadelphia, Pennsylvania)
- College: Notre Dame (2013–2017)
- NFL draft: 2018: 1st round, 9th overall pick

Career history
- San Francisco 49ers (2018–2022); Denver Broncos (2023–present)

Awards and highlights
- PFWA All-Rookie Team (2018); Consensus All-American (2017)

Career NFL statistics as of Week 6, 2026
- Games played: 121
- Games started: 121
- Stats at Pro Football Reference

Michael Sean McGlinchey (born January 12, 1995) is an American professional football offensive tackle for the Denver Broncos of the National Football League (NFL). He played college football for the Notre Dame Fighting Irish.

== Early life ==
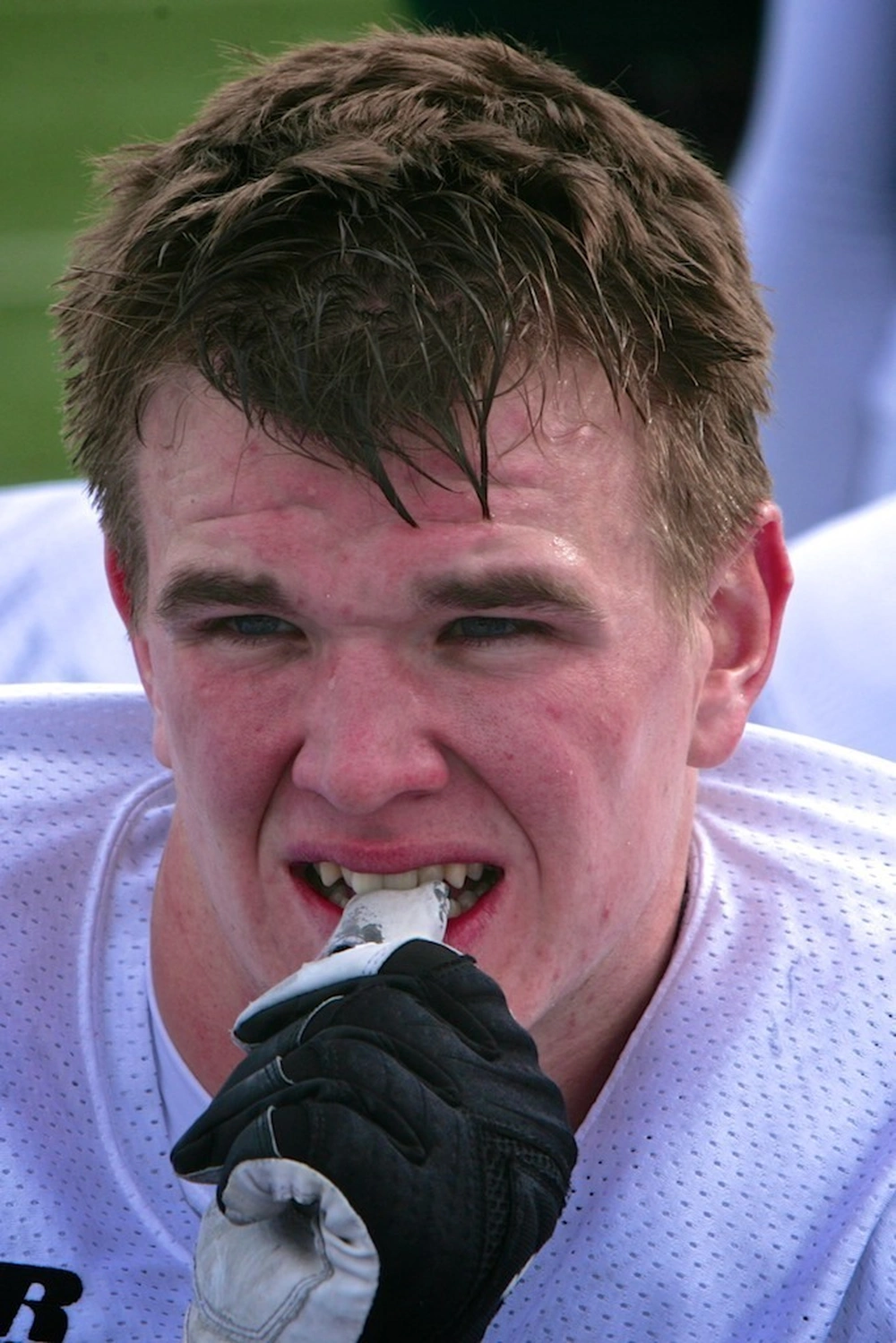
McGlinchey while in high school

McGlinchey attended St. Joseph/St. Robert School (Warrington, Pennsylvania) and William Penn Charter School (Philadelphia, Pennsylvania). Along with football, he also played basketball in high school. He committed to the University of Notre Dame to play college football.

== College career ==
After redshirting his first year at Notre Dame in 2013, McGlinchey played in all 13 games with one start in 2014. In 2015, he became a starter and started all 13 games at right tackle. Prior to 2016, he moved from right to left tackle. McGlinchey said he would be returning to Notre Dame for his fifth year of eligibility. He was named a team captain. He ended his collegiate career appearing in 51 games with 39 starts.

== Professional career ==
External videos
- NFL Draft Profile: Mike McGlinchey
- Mike McGlinchey's NFL Combine Workout

Pre-draft measurables
Height	Weight	Arm length	Hand span	Wingspan	Vertical jump	Broad jump	Bench press	Wonderlic
6 ft 7 7/8 in (2.03 m)	309 lb (140 kg)	34 in (0.86 m)	10 in (0.25 m)	6 ft 9 in (2.06 m)	28.5 in (0.72 m)	8 ft 9 in (2.67 m)	24 reps	37
All values from NFL Combine

=== San Francisco 49ers ===
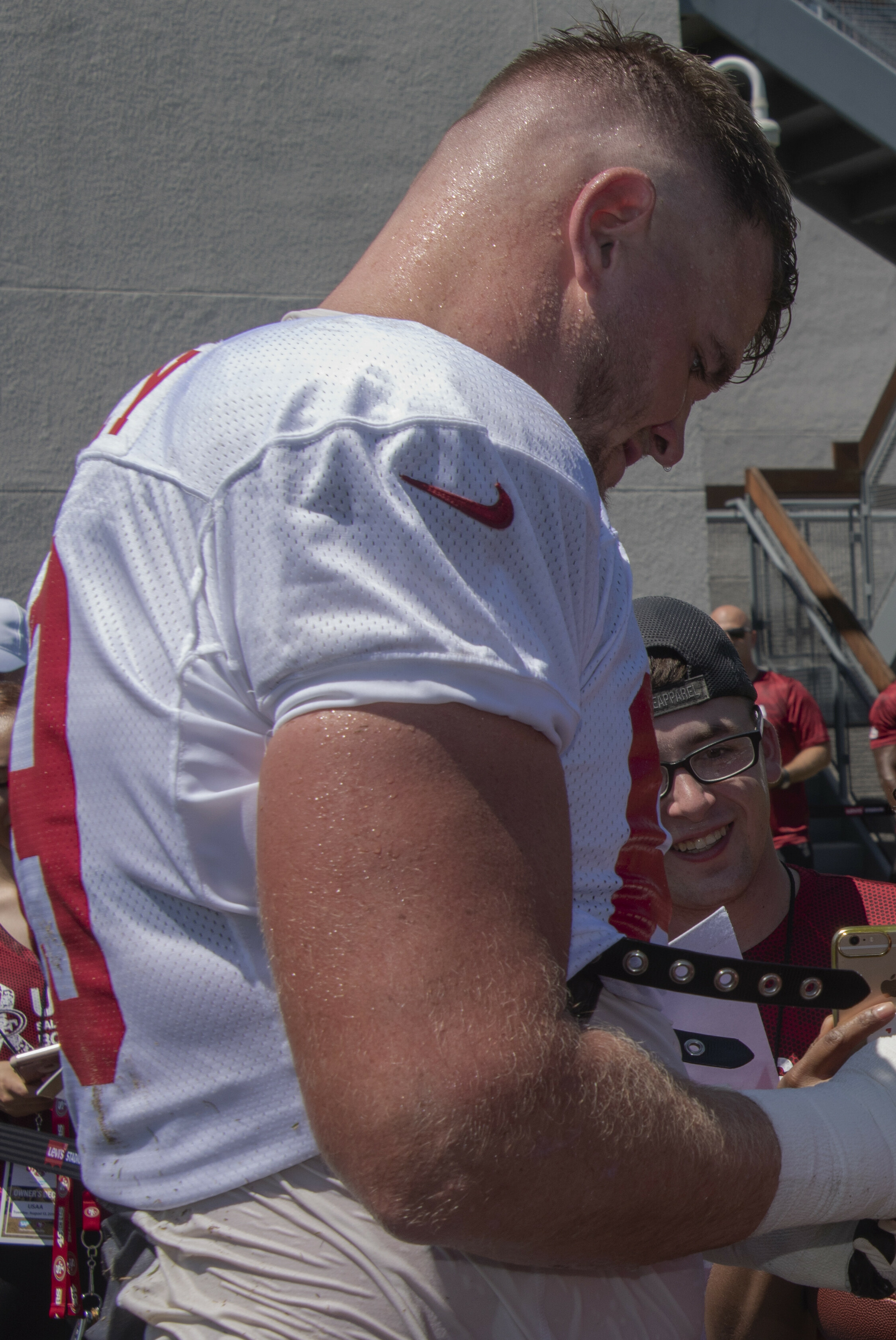
McGlinchey signing autographs in 2019

The San Francisco 49ers selected McGlinchey in the first round (ninth overall) of the 2018 NFL draft. McGlinchey was the first offensive tackle drafted in 2018 and was the second offensive lineman selected, behind Notre Dame teammate Quenton Nelson (sixth overall).

External videos
- 49ers draft Mike McGlinchey 9th overall

==== 2018 season ====
On July 23, 2018, the 49ers signed McGlinchey to a fully guaranteed four-year, US$18.34 million contract that includes a signing bonus of $11.41 million.

McGlinchey entered training camp slated as the starting right tackle, replacing Trent Brown who departed via trade. Head coach Kyle Shanahan named him the starting right tackle to begin the regular season, opposite starting left tackle Joe Staley. As a rookie, he started in all 16 games for the 49ers. He was named to the PFWA All-Rookie Team.

==== 2019 season ====
In 2019, McGlinchey played 12 games and helped the 49ers with 13. He missed four games during the season due to a knee injury. He helped the 49ers beat the Minnesota Vikings and Green Bay Packers to reach Super Bowl LIV. However, the 49ers lost 31–20 to the Kansas City Chiefs.

==== 2021 season ====
On May 1, 2021, the 49ers picked up the fifth-year option on McGlinchey's contract. The option guaranteed a salary of $10.9 million for the 2022 season. He suffered a torn quadriceps in Week 9 and was placed on injured reserve on November 10, 2021, ending his season.

=== Denver Broncos ===
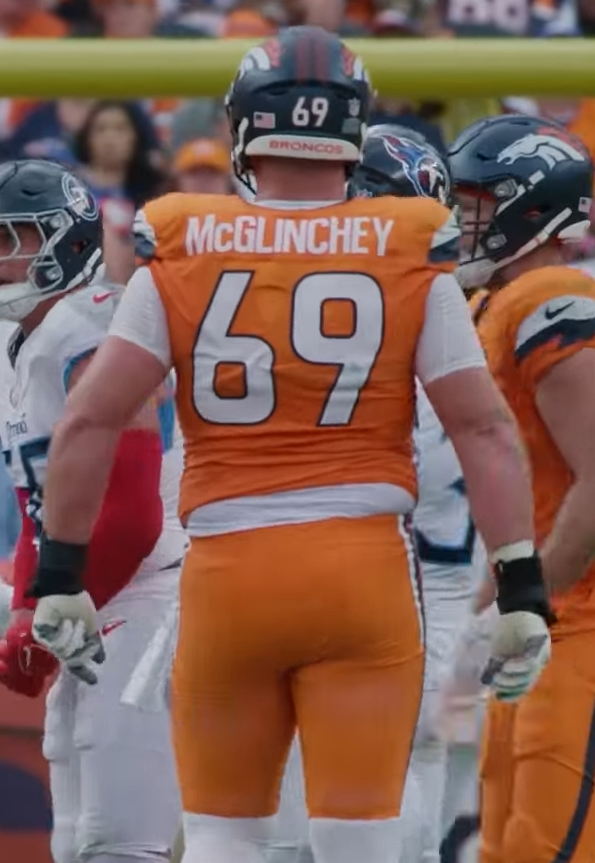
McGlinchey with the Denver Broncos in 2025

On March 15, 2023, McGlinchey signed a five-year, $87.5 million contract with the Denver Broncos.

On September 18, 2024, McGlinchey was placed on injured reserve after suffering an MCL sprain during the Broncos' Week 2 matchup against the Pittsburgh Steelers. He was activated on October 17.

== Personal life ==
McGlinchey has a younger brother, Jimmy, who was diagnosed with autism at age two, leading McGlinchey to support those who have autism, or otherwise have special needs.

McGlinchey's brother, Matt, played football for Ursinus College.

McGlinchey's first cousin, Matt Ryan (their mothers are sisters), is a retired NFL quarterback who played for the Atlanta Falcons and the Indianapolis Colts.

McGlinchey married his wife, Brooke, in 2023. They have a son, born August 2024.
