= Trent Brown =

American football player (born 1993)

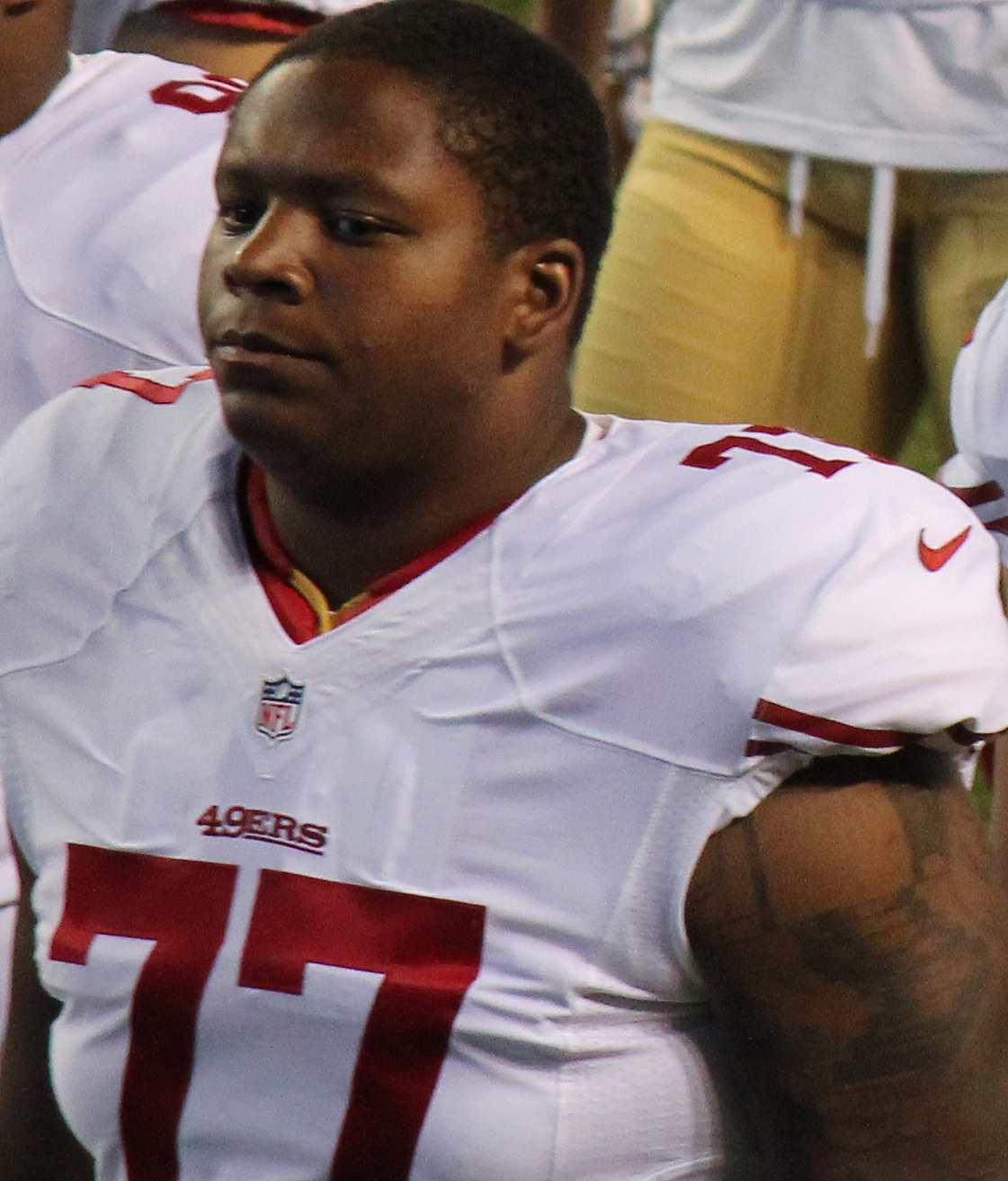
- Brown with the San Francisco 49ers in 2015

No. 77 – Houston Texans
- Position: Offensive tackle
- Roster status: Active

Personal information
- Born: April 13, 1993 (age 33); Bastrop, Texas, U.S.
- Listed height: 6 ft 8 in (2.03 m)
- Listed weight: 380 lb (172 kg)

Career information
- High school: Westover (Albany, Georgia)
- College: Georgia Military (2011–2012); Florida (2013–2014)
- NFL draft: 2015: 7th round, 244th overall pick

Career history
- San Francisco 49ers (2015–2017); New England Patriots (2018); Oakland / Las Vegas Raiders (2019–2020); New England Patriots (2021–2023); Cincinnati Bengals (2024); Houston Texans (2025–present)

Awards and highlights
- Super Bowl champion (LIII); Pro Bowl (2019)

Career NFL statistics as of 2025
- Games played: 110
- Games started: 103
- Stats at Pro Football Reference

Trenton Jacoby Brown (born April 13, 1993) is an American professional football offensive tackle for the Houston Texans of the National Football League (NFL). He played college football at Georgia Military College and for the Florida Gators before being selected by the San Francisco 49ers in the seventh round of the 2015 NFL draft. Brown has also played for the Oakland / Las Vegas Raiders, New England Patriots, and Cincinnati Bengals.

== Early life ==
Brown was born in Bastrop, Texas on April 13, 1993. He attended Deerfield-Windsor School before transferring to Westover Comprehensive High School, both in Albany, Georgia, and played basketball his first two years of high school before moving to football during his junior year. Brown graduated from Westover High in 2011.

== College career ==
=== Georgia Military College ===
Brown enrolled in Georgia Military College in Milledgeville, Georgia in the Fall 2011. He played for the GMC Bulldogs for two years, where the Bulldogs running game averaged 188 yards-per-game. After Brown displayed his skills at the junior college level, where he was named a second team NJCAA All-American in 2012, Brown was recruited by several NCAA Division I schools, including Arizona, Arkansas, Florida State, Georgia, Kansas, LSU, Oklahoma, Ole Miss, Mississippi State and Texas A&M.

=== Florida ===
Brown eventually chose to continue his college career at the University of Florida, signing a National Letter of Intent in December 2012 and enrolling in May 2013. Standing at 6-foot-8 and weighing 363 pounds, Brown was the Gators biggest offensive lineman since Max Starks, who played for the team in 2003 and was believed to be the biggest player to ever wear a Florida Gators uniform until Desmond Watson in 2021.

At the beginning of his first year at Florida, Brown was used mainly on field goals and "Jumbo" packages in short yardage situations. He took over the starting tackle job in the Georgia game after Tyler Moore was injured and lost for the year. Brown moved to starting guard at the beginning of the 2014 season.

== Professional career ==
Pre-draft measurables
| Height | Weight | Arm length | Hand span | Wingspan | 40-yard dash | 10-yard split | 20-yard split | 20-yard shuttle | Three-cone drill | Vertical jump | Broad jump | Bench press |
|---|---|---|---|---|---|---|---|---|---|---|---|---|
| 6 ft 8 1/2 in (2.04 m) | 355 lb (161 kg) | 36 in (0.91 m) | 10 7/8 in (0.28 m) | 7 ft 3 3/8 in (2.22 m) | 5.29 s | 1.89 s | 3.08 s | 4.78 s | 8.23 s | 28.0 in (0.71 m) | 8 ft 10 in (2.69 m) | 20 reps |
All values from NFL Combine/Pro Day

=== San Francisco 49ers ===
On May 2, 2015, Brown was selected by the San Francisco 49ers in the seventh round (244th overall) of the 2015 NFL draft. He started the last two regular season games of his rookie season and played in a total of five games.

After being asked in a 2016 interview to name the blocker that gives him the most trouble, then Denver Broncos linebacker and Super Bowl 50 MVP Von Miller said, "I feel like Trent Brown has a very bright future in the National Football League. He's 6-foot-8. He knows how to use his arms, knows how to use his wingspan and he has length. So I feel like he's young and people haven't really seen him, but I feel like he's one of the better tackles in the National Football League." On August 16, 2017, Miller made a similar remark about Brown to the San Francisco Chronicle after the Broncos and 49ers had a joint practice, stating:

"He's the best right tackle in the National Football League! And he may even be a top-five tackle, period, in the National Football League. There's not another tackle who's that tall, that big and can move the way he moves."

Brown started all 16 regular season games for the 49ers in 2016.

In 2017, Brown started in 10 games at right tackle before being placed on injured reserve on December 16, 2017, with a shoulder injury.

=== New England Patriots ===
On April 27, 2018, Brown was traded along with the 143rd selection in the 2018 NFL draft to the New England Patriots for the 95th selection (Tarvarius Moore). His arrival was part of Patriots head coach Bill Belichick's attempt to build one of the heaviest rosters for a power-running offense. After playing right tackle during his tenure with the 49ers, Brown became the Patriots' starting left tackle in 2018, starting all 16 games. With Brown, the Patriots reached and went on to win Super Bowl LIII over the Los Angeles Rams.

=== Oakland / Las Vegas Raiders ===
On March 13, 2019, Brown signed a four-year, $66 million contract with the Oakland Raiders with $36.75 million guaranteed, making him the highest-paid offensive lineman in the league. Head coach Jon Gruden announced that Brown would play right tackle with Kolton Miller remaining at left tackle. In his first 11 games with the Raiders, Brown allowed only one sack in 326 pass-blocking snaps. On December 17, he was named a Pro Bowl selection for the first time in his career. The next day, Brown was placed on injured reserve, prematurely ending his season.

Brown was placed on the reserve/COVID-19 list by the Raiders on October 21, 2020, and was activated nine days later. Just before their Week 8 matchup against the Cleveland Browns, Brown was hospitalized after a pregame IV caused air to enter his bloodstream and he missed the game as a result. Brown was placed back on the COVID-19 list on November 5, and activated again on December 2.

=== New England Patriots (second stint) ===
On March 17, 2021, Brown and a 2022 seventh-round pick were traded to the Patriots for a 2022 fifth-round pick. He was named the Patriots starting right tackle. Brown suffered a calf injury in Week 1, missed the next three games, and was placed on injured reserve on October 9. He was activated on November 13.

Brown was re-signed by the Patriots on March 21, 2022, to a two-year, $14 million deal. Originally brought back to be the Patriots' right tackle again, the team chose to move him back to left tackle during the preseason, which was the position Brown originally played for them in 2018.

=== Cincinnati Bengals ===
On March 19, 2024, Brown signed with the Cincinnati Bengals. He was named the starting right tackle to begin the season. During a Week 3 38–33 loss to the Washington Commanders, Brown went down with a torn patellar tendon. He was placed on season-ending injured reserve two days later.

=== Houston Texans ===
On March 24, 2025, Brown signed on a one-year, $3 million deal with the Houston Texans. He was released on August 26 as part of final roster cuts, but re-signed to the practice squad the next day. On October 3, Brown was signed to the active roster.

On March 10, 2026, Brown signed a one-year, $7 million contract extension with the Texans.
