= 2025 Denver Broncos season =

American football team season

- Owner: Rob Walton (Note: Other members of the ownership group include Carrie Walton Penner, Greg Penner, Mellody Hobson, Condoleezza Rice, and Lewis Hamilton)
- General manager: George Paton
- Head coach: Sean Payton
- Offensive coordinator: Joe Lombardi
- Defensive coordinator: Vance Joseph
- Home stadium: Empower Field at Mile High

Results
- Record: 14–3
- Division place: 1st AFC West
- Playoffs: Won Divisional Playoffs (vs. Bills) 33–30 (OT); Lost AFC Championship (vs. Patriots) 7–10
- All-Pros: LT Garett Bolles (1st team); RG Quinn Meinerz (1st team); DT Zach Allen (1st team); ST Devon Key (1st team); CB Patrick Surtain II (2nd team); S Talanoa Hufanga (2nd team)
- Pro Bowlers: 6: WR Courtland Sutton; T Garett Bolles; G Quinn Meinerz; DT Zach Allen; OLB Nik Bonitto; CB Patrick Surtain II

Uniform
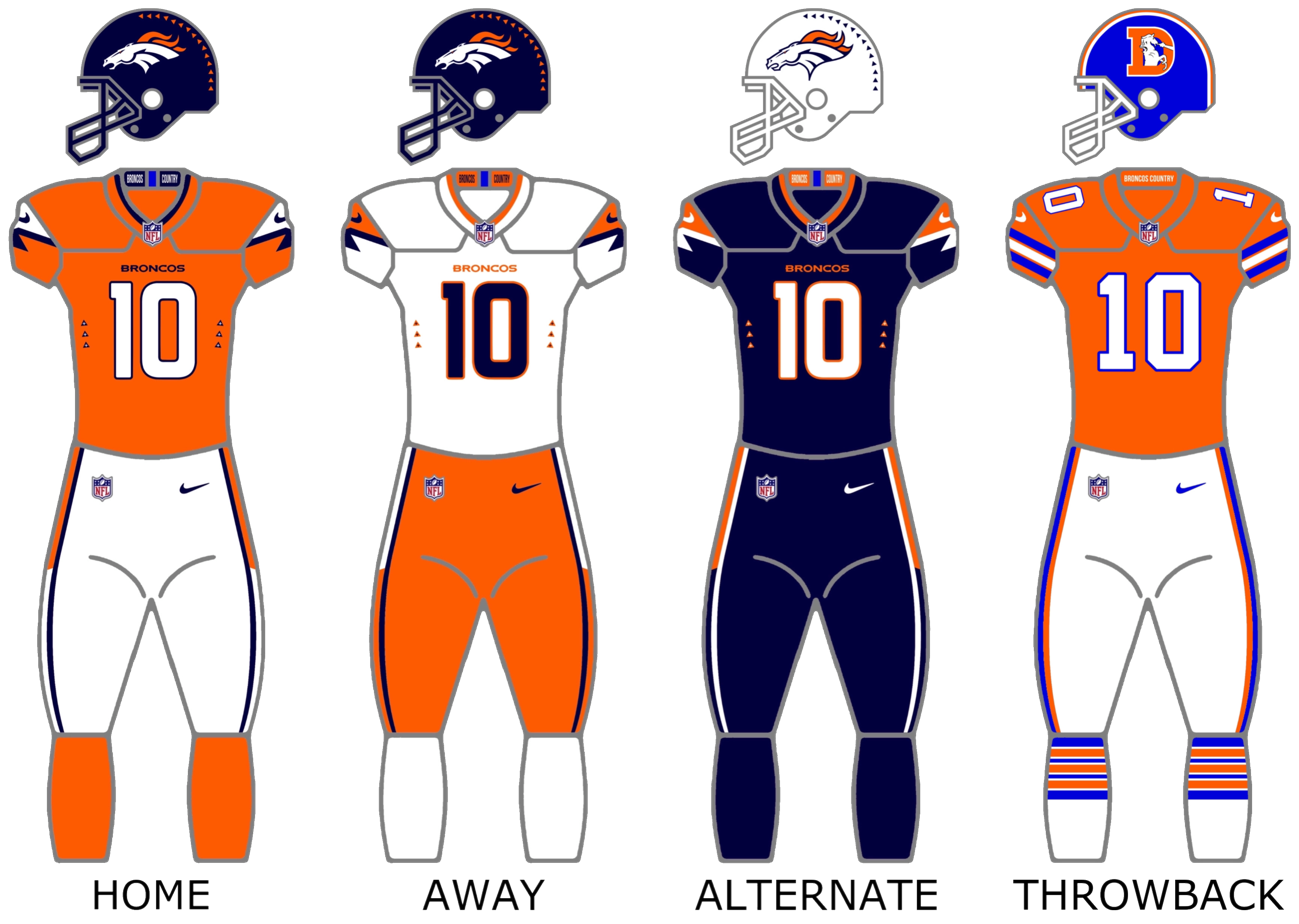

The 2025 season was the Denver Broncos' 56th in the National Football League (NFL) and its 66th overall. It is also the team's fifth under the leadership of general manager George Paton, its fourth under the ownership of the Walton-Penner family group and its third under head coach Sean Payton.

They became the first team in the AFC to clinch a playoff berth following their Week 15 win over the Green Bay Packers, clinching the playoffs for the second consecutive season.

With a 14–3 record, the Broncos tied a franchise record for wins in a single season, previously set in 1998. The Broncos clinched their first AFC West division title and No. 1 seed since their 2015 Super Bowl-winning season, finishing tied with the New England Patriots, but earning the No. 1 seed based on the common games tiebreaker, and ending their 10 year drought since they last advanced past the first round of the playoffs.

The Broncos defeated the Buffalo Bills, 33–30, in the Divisional Round to advance to the AFC Championship Game; however, starting quarterback Bo Nix suffered a season-ending ankle injury on the second-to-last play. With backup quarterback Jarrett Stidham starting, the Broncos lost to the Patriots at home by a final score of 10–7. They fired offensive coordinator Joe Lombardi a couple days after the loss.

== Coaching changes ==
=== Offseason ===
2025 Denver Broncos coaching staff changes
Position	Previous coach	Replacement(s)	Source(s)
Assistant special teams coach	Chris Banjo, 2023–2024	Marwan Maalouf	
Tight ends coach	Declan Doyle, 2023–2024	Austin King	
Assistant offensive line coach	Austin King, 2023–2024	Chris Morgan	
Special teams coordinator	Ben Kotwicaa , 2023–2024	Darren Rizzi	
Defensive quality control coach	Addison Lynch, 2023–2024; Isaac Shewmaker, 2023–2024	Todd Davis; Brian Niedermeyer	
Inside linebackers coach	Greg Manusky, 2023–2024	Jeff Schmedding	
Offensive pass game coordinator	John Morton, 2023–2024	Davis Webb	
Assistant strength and conditioning coach	Shaun Snee, 2023–2024	Taylor Porter	
Outside linebackers coach	Michael Wilhoite, 2023–2024	Isaac Shewmaker	
Special teams quality control coach	None	Zach Line	
Cornerbacks coach	None	Addison Lynch	
Director of game management	None	Evan Rothstein	
Director of strength and conditioning	None	Shaun Snee	
Offensive run game coordinator	None	Zach Strief	

Notes:

- Darren Rizzi and Zach Strief also held the title of assistant head coach, alongside Jim Leonhard.
- Austin King, Addison Lynch, Isaac Shewmaker, Shaun Snee, Zach Strief and Davis Webb were all promoted from within the organization, and were not new hires.

=== In-season ===
On January 17, it was announced that John Morton would re-join the team for the postseason as an offensive consultant after being let go from his previous position as the offensive coordinator of the Detroit Lions.

== Front office changes ==
2025 Denver Broncos front office staff changes
Position	Previous executive	Replacement	Source(s)
Director of player personnel	Reed Burckhardt, 2022–2024	A. J. Durso; Cam Williams	
Director of pro personnel	A. J. Durso, 2017–2024	Jordon Dizon	
Assistant general manager	Darren Mougey, 2022–2024	Reed Burckhardt	
Scout	Rob Paton, 2017–2024	None	
Assistant director of college scouting	Nick Schiralli, 2021–2024	Dave Bratten	
Senior personnel executive	David Shaw, 2024	Nick Schiralli	
Director of college scouting	Brian Stark, 2017–2024	Bryan Chesin	
Vice president of football operations	Mark Thewes, 2020–2024	None	
Player personnel coordinator/scout	None	Roya Burton	
Senior college scout	None	Scott DiStefano	
National scout	None	Deon Randall	
Midwest area/international scout	None	Ish Seisay	

Notes:

- Dave Bratten, Reed Burckhardt, Roya Burton, Bryan Chesin, Scott DiStefano, A. J. Durso, Deon Randall, Nick Schiralli, and Ish Seisay were all promoted from within the organization, and were not new hires.

== Roster changes ==
=== Future contracts ===
All players listed below were signed to reserve/future contracts on January 13, unless otherwise noted. Each player was officially added to the active roster on March 12—the first day of the 2025 league year.

Position	Player
WR	Michael Bandy
ILB	K. J. Cloyd
OLB	Andrew Farmer
G	Nick Gargiulo
DE	Matt Henningsen
S	Tanner McCalister
NT	Jordan Miller
CB	Quinton Newsome
WR	A. T. Perry
OT	Will Sherman
S	Keidron Smith
CB	Reese Taylor
G	Calvin Throckmorton
TE	Thomas Yassmin

Notes:

- Michael Bandy was signed on January 15.

=== Free agents ===
Position	Player	Tag	Team signed with	Date signed	Notes	Source(s)
OT	Quinn Bailey	UFA	None			
ILB	Cody Barton	UFA	Tennessee Titans	March 13	3 years, $21 million	
FB	Michael Burton	UFA	Denver Broncos	March 26	1 year, $1.423 million	
ILB	Zach Cunningham	UFA	Detroit Lions	May 27	1 year, $1.255 million	
P	Riley Dixon	UFA	Tampa Bay Buccaneers	March 13	2 years, $6 million	
LS	Mitchell Fraboni	RFA	Denver Broncos	March 11	3 years, $4.175 million	
WR	Lil'Jordan Humphrey	UFA	New York Giants	March 21	1 year, $1.245 million	
DE	Jordan Jackson	ERFA	Denver Broncos	March 4	1 year, $0.96 million	
NT	D. J. Jones	UFA	Denver Broncos	March 11	3 years, $39 million	
S	Devon Key	ERFA	Denver Broncos	March 4	1 year, $0.96 million	
TE	Lucas Krull	ERFA	Denver Broncos	March 4	1 year, $1.03 million	
CB	Ja'Quan McMillian	ERFA	Denver Broncos	March 4	1 year, $1.03 million	
OT	Matt Peart	UFA	Denver Broncos	March 12	2 years, $7 million	
CB	Tremon Smith	UFA	Houston Texans	March 14	2 years, $6.5 million	
QB	Jarrett Stidham	UFA	Denver Broncos	March 10	2 years, $12 million	
ILB	Justin Strnad	UFA	Denver Broncos	March 13	1 year, $2.788 million	
OLB	Dondrea Tillman	ERFA	Denver Broncos	March 4	1 year, $0.96 million	
RB	Javonte Williams	UFA	Dallas Cowboys	March 14	1 year, $3 million	
QB	Zach Wilson	UFA	Miami Dolphins	March 17	1 year, $6 million	
Unrestricted Free Agent (UFA): Players with four or more accrued seasons whose contracts expired at the end of the previous season Restricted Free Agent (RFA): Players with three accrued seasons whose contracts expired at the end of the previous season Exclusive-Rights Free Agent (ERFA): Players with two or fewer accrued seasons whose contracts expired at the end of the previous season

Source for this section: USA Today.

=== Signings ===
Position	Player	Previous team	Date signed	Notes	Source(s)
TE	Evan Engram	Jacksonville Jaguars	March 13	2 years, $23 million	
ILB	Dre Greenlaw	San Francisco 49ers	March 13	3 years, $35 million	
S	Talanoa Hufanga	San Francisco 49ers	March 13	3 years, $45 million	
WR	Trent Sherfield	Minnesota Vikings	March 13	2 years, $6 million	
P	Matt Haack	Jacksonville Jaguars	March 19	1 year, $1.255 million	
QB	Sam Ehlinger	Indianapolis Colts	April 2	1 year, $1.338 million	
S	Sam Franklin Jr.	Carolina Panthers	April 11	1 year, $1.5 million	
LS	Zach Triner	Miami Dolphins	April 21	1 year, $1.17 million	
TE	Cole Fotheringham	Las Vegas Raiders	May 12	1 year, $0.84 million	
LS	Zach Triner	Denver Broncos	May 12	1 year, $1.17 million	
TE	Caden Prieskorn	Detroit Lions	June 3	1 year, $0.84 million	
RB	J. K. Dobbins	Los Angeles Chargers	June 11	1 year, $5.25 million	
CB	Mario Goodrich	Birmingham Stallions (UFL)	June 18	1 year, $1.03 million	
OLB	Garrett Nelson	San Antonio Brahmas (UFL)	July 31	1 year, $0.84 million	
ILB	Garret Wallow	Tennessee Titans	August 1	1 year, $1.1 million	
CB	Gregory Junior	Green Bay Packers	August 10	1 year, $1.03 million	
CB	Micah Abraham	St. Louis Battlehawks (UFL)	August 15	1 year, $0.84 million	
FB	Adam Prentice	New Orleans Saints	August 17	1 year, $1.13 million	
DT	Michael Dwumfour	San Francisco 49ers	August 20	1 year, $1.03 million	
ILB	Levelle Bailey	Denver Broncos	August 27	Practice squad	
WR	Michael Bandy	Denver Broncos	August 27	Practice squad	
QB	Sam Ehlinger	Denver Broncos	August 27	Practice squad	
TE	Caleb Lohner	Denver Broncos	August 27	Practice squad	
C	Joe Michalski	Denver Broncos	August 27	Practice squad	
NT	Jordan Miller	Denver Broncos	August 27	Practice squad	
CB	Quinton Newsome	Denver Broncos	August 27	Practice squad	
WR	A. T. Perry	Denver Broncos	August 27	Practice squad	
FB	Adam Prentice	Denver Broncos	August 27	Practice squad	
CB	Jaden Robinson	Denver Broncos	August 27	Practice squad	
S	Keidron Smith	Denver Broncos	August 27	Practice squad	
CB	Reese Taylor	Denver Broncos	August 27	Practice squad	
G	Calvin Throckmorton	Denver Broncos	August 27	Practice squad	
ILB	Jordan Turner	Denver Broncos	August 27	Practice squad	
S	Delarrin Turner-Yell	Denver Broncos	August 27	Practice squad	
ILB	Garret Wallow	Denver Broncos	August 27	Practice squad	
TE	Patrick Murtagh	Jacksonville Jaguars	August 28	Practice squad	
WR	Thayer Thomas	Minnesota Vikings	September 2	Practice squad	
QB	Sam Ehlinger	Denver Broncos	September 6	Promoted to active	
RB	Deuce Vaughn	Dallas Cowboys	September 9	Practice squad	
FB	Adam Prentice	Denver Broncos	September 24	Promoted to active	
CB	A. J. Woods	Philadelphia Eagles	September 24	Practice squad	
ILB	Garret Wallow	Denver Broncos	October 4	Promoted to active	
WR	Samori Toure	Chicago Bears	October 5	Practice squad	
S	J. T. Gray	Baltimore Ravens	October 13	Signed off PS	
G	Calvin Throckmorton	Denver Broncos	October 14	Promoted to active	
G	Karsen Barnhart	Los Angeles Chargers	October 14	Practice squad	
OLB	Garrett Nelson	New Orleans Saints	October 14	Practice squad	
QB	Sam Ehlinger	Denver Broncos	October 18	Practice squad	
OT	Marques Cox	Denver Broncos	October 21	Practice squad	
QB	Sam Ehlinger	Denver Broncos	October 22	Promoted to active	
WR	Kyrese Rowan	Denver Broncos	October 22	Practice squad	
QB	Sam Ehlinger	Denver Broncos	October 29	Practice squad	
TE	Marcedes Lewis	Chicago Bears	October 29	Practice squad	
WR	Michael Bandy	Denver Broncos	November 6	Promoted to active	
OT	Geron Christian	Dallas Cowboys	November 11	Signed off PS	
WR	Michael Bandy	Denver Broncos	November 12	Practice squad	
WR	Lil'Jordan Humphrey	New York Giants	November 12	Signed off PS	
OLB	Garrett Nelson	Denver Broncos	November 12	Practice squad	
CB	Reese Taylor	Denver Broncos	November 15	Promoted to active	
OT	Marques Cox	Denver Broncos	November 24	Practice squad	
WR	Elijah Moore	Buffalo Bills	December 2	Practice squad	
TE	Marcedes Lewis	Denver Broncos	December 6	Promoted to active	
RB	Sincere McCormick	Arizona Cardinals	December 8	Practice squad	
WR	Kyrese Rowan	Denver Broncos	December 9	Practice squad	
ILB	Jordan Turner	Denver Broncos	December 13	Promoted to active	
TE	Marcedes Lewis	Denver Broncos	December 13	Practice squad	
RB	Cody Schrader	Houston Texans	December 15	Claimed off waivers	
G	Nash Jones	Los Angeles Chargers	December 17	Practice squad	
G	Calvin Throckmorton	Denver Broncos	December 19	Practice squad	
TE	Mercedes Lewis	Denver Broncos	December 25	Promoted to active	
G	Calvin Throckmorton	Denver Broncos	December 25	Promoted to active	
C	Sam Mustipher	Los Angeles Chargers	December 26	Signed off PS	
RB	Cody Schrader	Denver Broncos	December 27	Practice squad	
G	Calvin Throckmorton	Denver Broncos	December 30	Practice squad	
QB	Sam Ehlinger	Denver Broncos	January 5	Promoted to active	
S	Tanner McCalister	Kansas City Chiefs	January 6	Practice squad	
OT	Geron Christian	Denver Broncos	January 7	Practice squad	
C	Michael Deiter	Washington Commanders	January 7	Practice squad	
TE	Marcedes Lewis	Denver Broncos	January 7	Practice squad	
QB	Ben DiNucci	Atlanta Falcons	January 18	Practice squad	
WR	Brandon Johnson	Pittsburgh Steelers	January 20	Practice squad	

=== Departures ===
Position	Player	Date	Notes	Source(s)
P	Matt Haack	May 9	Released	
LS	Zach Triner	May 9	Released	
CB	Kendall Bohler	May 12	Waived	
ILB	K. J. Cloyd	May 12	Waived	
NT	Christian Dowell	May 12	Waived	
TE	Thomas Yassmin	May 12	Waived	
TE	Cole Fotheringham	June 3	Waived/injured	
TE	Cole Fotheringham	June 5	Waived from IR	
LS	Zach Triner	June 11	Released	
S	Tanner McCalister	June 18	Waived	
CB	Mario Goodrich	August 1	Waived	
DE	Matt Henningsen	August 10	Waived/injured	
CB	Gregory Junior	August 15	Waived/injured	
ILB	J. B. Brown	August 20	Waived	
CB	Gregory Junior	August 22	Waived from IR	
CB	Micah Abraham	August 24	Waived	
WR	Joaquin Davis	August 24	Waived	
ILB	Andrew Farmer	August 24	Waived	
CB	Joshua Pickett	August 24	Waived	
G	Clay Webb	August 24	Waived	
T	Marques Cox	August 25	Waived	
DT	Michael Dwumfour	August 25	Waived	
RB	Audric Estimé	August 25	Waived	
CB	Damarri Mathis	August 25	Waived	
OLB	Garrett Nelson	August 25	Waived	
WR	Jerjuan Newton	August 25	Waived	
WR	Kyrese Rowan	August 25	Waived	
OT	Xavier Truss	August 25	Waived	
RB	Blake Watson	August 25	Waived	
ILB	Levelle Bailey	August 26	Waived	
WR	Michael Bandy	August 26	Waived	
QB	Sam Ehlinger	August 26	Released	
S	Sam Franklin Jr.	August 26	Released	
WR	Courtney Jackson	August 26	Waived	
TE	Caleb Lohner	August 26	Waived	
C	Joe Michalski	August 26	Waived	
NT	Jordan Miller	August 26	Waived	
CB	Quinton Newsome	August 26	Waived	
WR	A. T. Perry	August 26	Waived	
FB	Adam Prentice	August 26	Released	
TE	Caden Prieskorn	August 26	Waived	
CB	Jaden Robinson	August 26	Waived	
G	Will Sherman	August 26	Waived	
S	Keidron Smith	August 26	Waived	
CB	Reese Taylor	August 26	Waived	
G	Calvin Throckmorton	August 26	Released	
ILB	Jordan Turner	August 26	Waived	
S	Delarrin Turner-Yell	August 26	Waived	
ILB	Garret Wallow	August 26	Released	
DE	Kristian Williams	August 26	Waived/injured	
CB	Quinton Newsome	September 2	Released from PS	
DE	Kristian Williams	September 8	Waived from IR	
QB	Sam Ehlinger	October 17	Released	
WR	Thayer Thomas	October 18	Released from IR	
CB	A. J. Woods	October 18	Waived from PS	
G	Karsen Barnhart	October 21	Waived from PS	
QB	Sam Ehlinger	October 28	Released	
OLB	Garrett Nelson	October 28	Waived from PS	
WR	Samori Toure	October 28	Waived from PS	
S	J. T. Gray	November 4	Released	
WR	Michael Bandy	November 11	Waived	
OT	Marques Cox	November 11	Released from PS	
WR	Trent Sherfield	November 15	Waived	
WR	Kyrese Rowan	December 2	Released from PS	
ILB	Garret Wallow	December 6	Waived	
OT	Marques Cox	December 9	Waived from PS	
TE	Marcedes Lewis	December 11	Waived	
S	Keidron Smith	December 15	Signed off PS	
RB	Sincere McCormick	December 16	Released from PS	
G	Calvin Throckmorton	December 18	Waived	
RB	Cody Schrader	December 25	Waived	
G	Calvin Throckmorton	December 26	Waived	
OT	Geron Christian	January 5	Waived	
TE	Marcedes Lewis	January 5	Waived	
G	Nash Jones	January 7	Released from PS	
C	Joe Michalski	January 7	Released from PS	
OLB	Garrett Nelson	January 19	Released from PS	
C	Michael Deiter	January 20	Released from PS	

=== Extensions and restructures ===
Position	Player	Date signed	Notes	Source(s)
OLB	Jonathon Cooper	March 21	Restructure	
WR	Courtland Sutton	July 28	4 years, $92 million	
DE	Zach Allen	August 2	4 years, $102 million	
OLB	Nik Bonitto	September 4	4 years, $106 million	
K	Wil Lutz	November 24	3 years, $16.1 million	
DT	Malcolm Roach	November 26	3 years, $24 million	
C	Luke Wattenberg	November 26	4 years, $48 million	

=== Trades ===
Trade partner	Broncos give	Broncos receive	Date	Source
New Orleans Saints	WR Devaughn Vele	2026 fourth-round selection 2027 seventh-round selection	August 20	

=== Draft ===
2025 Denver Broncos draft selections
Round	Selection	Player	Position	College	Notes
1	20	Jahdae Barron	CB	Texas	
2	51	Traded to the Carolina Panthers (Note: The Broncos traded a second round selection (51st overall), a third round selection (85th overall), a fourth round selection (122nd overall), and a sixth-round selection (208th overall) to the Carolina Panthers in exchange for 2nd round selection (57th overall), a 3rd round selection (74th overall), a fourth round selection (111th overall) and a seventh-round selection (230th overall).)			
2	57	Traded to the Detroit Lions (Note: The Broncos traded a 2nd round selection (57th overall) and a 7 round selection (230th overall) for a second round selection (60th overall) and a fourth round selection (130th overall).)			From Panthers
2	60	RJ Harvey	RB	UCF	From Lions
3	74	Pat Bryant	WR	Illinois	From Panthers
3	85	Traded to the Carolina Panthers			
3	101	Sai'vion Jones	DE	LSU	From Rams via Falcons and Eagles (Note: The Broncos traded two fourth round selections (111th overall and 130th overall) along with a sixth round selection (191st overall) to the Eagles in exchange for a third round selection (101st overall) and a fourth round selection (134th overall).)
4	111	Traded to the Philadelphia Eagles			From Panthers
4	122	Traded to the Carolina Panthers			
4	130	Traded to the Philadelphia Eagles			From Lions
4	134	Que Robinson	DE	Alabama	From Eagles
5	155	Traded to the Miami Dolphins (Note: The Broncos traded a fifth-round selection and LB Bradley Chubb to the Miami Dolphins in exchange for a 2023 first-round selection, a 2024 fourth-round selection and RB Chase Edmonds.)			
6	191	Traded to the Philadelphia Eagles			From Cardinals (Note: The Broncos traded LB Baron Browning to the Arizona Cardinals in exchange for a sixth-round selection.)
6	197	Traded to the Houston Texans (Note: The Broncos traded the No. 197 selection to the Houston Texans in exchange for the Texans' sixth- and seventh-round selections—Nos. 216 and 241 overall, respectively.)			
6	208	Traded to the Carolina Panthers			From Eagles (Note: The Broncos traded a seventh-round selection and TE Albert Okwuegbunam to the Philadelphia Eagles in exchange for a sixth-round selection.)
6	216	Jeremy Crawshaw	P	Florida	From Texans
7	230	Traded to the Detroit Lions			From Cardinals via Panthers
7	236	Traded to the Philadelphia Eagles			
7	241	Caleb Lohner	TE	Utah	From Texans

Draft trades

=== Undrafted free agents ===
All undrafted free agents were signed on April 27, following the conclusion of the 2025 NFL draft unless otherwise noted.

2025 Denver Broncos undrafted free agents
Position	Player	College
CB	Kendall Bohler	Florida A&M
ILB	J. B. Brown	Kansas
T	Marques Cox	Kentucky
WR	Joaquin Davis	North Carolina Central
NT	Christian Dowell	UT Martin
WR	Courtney Jackson	Arkansas State
C	Joe Michalski	Oklahoma State
WR	Jerjuan Newton	Toledo
CB	Joshua Pickett	Duke
ILB	Karene Reid	Utah
CB	Jaden Robinson	Oregon State
WR	Kyrese Rowan	Utah State
G	Xavier Truss	Georgia
ILB	Jordan Turner	Michigan State
OLB	Johnny Walker Jr.	Missouri
G	Clay Webb	Jacksonville State
DT	Kristian Williams	Missouri

Notes:

- Jordan Turner and Kyrese Rowan were signed on May 12.

=== Suspensions ===
On October 20, linebacker Dre Greenlaw was suspended for one game, following an incident in which he verbally threatened referee Brad Allen at the end of the Broncos' Week 7 win over the New York Giants.

=== Injuries ===
Position	Player	Time of injury	Type of injury	Reserve list	Games missed	Source(s)
TE	Cole Fotheringham	OTAs	Undisclosed	Waived/injured, later waived with injury settlement	None	
WR	A. T. Perry	Minicamp	Ankle	Active/physically unable to perform	None	
ILB	Drew Sanders	Training camp	Foot	Reserve/injured	Week 1–Championship	
OLB	Johnny Walker Jr.	Training camp	Undisclosed	Reserve/injured	Entire 2025 season	
ILB	Dre Greenlaw	Training camp	Quad	Reserve/injured	Weeks 1–6	
TE	Nate Adkins	Preseason	Sprained ankle	–	Weeks 1–2	
FB	Michael Burton	Preseason	Hamstring	Reserve/injured	Entire 2025 season	
G	Nick Gargiulo	Preseason	Torn ACL	Reserve/injured	Entire 2025 season	
DE	Matt Henningsen	Preseason	Ruptured Achilles tendon	Waived/injured	Entire 2025 season	
CB	Gregory Junior	Preseason	Hamstring	Waived/injured, later waived with injury settlement	None	
CB	Joshua Pickett	Preseason	Hand	Waived with injury settlement	None	
RB	Blake Watson	Preseason	Strained PCL	Waived with injury settlement	None	
DT	Kristian Williams	Preseason	Undisclosed	Waived/injured, later waived with injury settlement	Week 1	
DT	Malcolm Roach	Week 1 practice	Strained calf	Reserve/injured	Weeks 1–5	
TE	Evan Engram	Week 3 practice	Back	–	Week 3	
TE	Lucas Krull	Week 5 practice	Broken foot	Reserve/injured	Week 5–Championship	
G	Ben Powers	Week 5	Biceps	Reserve/injured	Weeks 6–15	
OLB	Jonah Elliss	Week 6 practice	Shoulder	–	Weeks 6–7	
G	Matt Peart	Week 6	Torn MCL	Reserve/injured	Week 7–Championship	
LB	Garret Wallow	Week 6	Hamstring	Reserve/injured	Weeks 7–10	
WR	Thayer Thomas	Week 7 practice	Undisclosed	Practice squad/injured, later released with injury settlement	None	
CB	Patrick Surtain II	Week 8	Pectoral	–	Weeks 9–11	
TE	Nate Adkins	Week 8	Knee	–	Weeks 9–14	
WR	Marvin Mims	Week 8	Concussion	–	Weeks 9–10	
S	P. J. Locke	Week 9 practice	Neck	–	Week 9	
S	J. T. Gray	Week 9	Hamstring	Released with injury settlement	None	
RB	J. K. Dobbins	Week 10	Lisfranc	Reserve/injured	Week 11–Championship	
OLB	Jonah Elliss	Week 10	Hamstring	–	Weeks 11–13	
ILB	Karene Reid	Week 10	Hamstring	Reserve/injured	Weeks 11–18	
ILB	Alex Singleton	Week 10	Testicular cancer	–	Week 11	
DT	D. J. Jones	Week 14 practice	Ankle	–	Week 14	
WR	Pat Bryant	Week 15 practice	Hamstring	–	Week 15	
S	Brandon Jones	Week 15	Pectoral	Reserve/injured	Week 16–Championship	
ILB	Justin Strnad	Week 15	Ankle	–	Week 16	
S	Delarrin Turner-Yell	Week 16	Knee	Practice squad/injured	None	
TE	Nate Adkins	Week 16	Knee	–	Week 17	
WR	Pat Bryant	Week 16	Concussion	–	Week 17	
ILB	Dre Greenlaw	Week 16	Hamstring	–	Weeks 17–18	
C	Luke Wattenberg	Week 17 practice	Shoulder	Reserve/injured	Week 17–Divisional	
DE	John Franklin-Myers	Week 17	Hip	–	Week 18	
QB	Bo Nix	Divisional	Fractured ankle	Reserve/injured	Championship	
C	Alex Forsyth	Divisional	Ankle	–	Championship	
WR	Troy Franklin	Divisional	Hamstring	–	Championship	
S	JL Skinner	Championship practice	Quad	–	Championship	

=== Practice squad elevations ===
2025 Denver Broncos standard elevations
Position	Name	Week(s)	Source(s)
ILB	Levelle Bailey	1, 17, 18	
WR	Michael Bandy	9, 15, 17, Championship	
QB	Sam Ehlinger	15, 16	
TE	Marcedes Lewis	9, 10, 11	
TE	Caleb Lohner	Divisional	
WR	Elijah Moore	Divisional, Champhionship	
FB	Adam Prentice	1, 2, 3	
CB	Reese Taylor	10	
G	Calvin Throckmorton	6	
ILB	Jordan Turner	8, 11, 14	
S	Delarrin Turner-Yell	16	
ILB	Garret Wallow	2, 3, 4	

== Staff ==
2025 Denver Broncos staff
Front office: Owner – Rob Walton; Owner / CEO – Greg Penner; Owner – Carrie Walton Penner; Owner – Mellody Hobson; Owner – Condoleezza Rice; Owner – Lewis Hamilton; President – Damani Leech; General manager – George Paton; Vice president of player personnel – Cody Rager; Assistant general manager – Reed Burckhardt; Co-director of player personnel – Cam Williams; Co-director of player personnel - A. J. Durso; Director of pro personnel – Jordon Dizon; Vice president of football operations – Kelly Kleine Van Calligan; Vice president of football administration – Rich Hurtado; Vice president of player development – Ray Jackson; Director of college scouting – Bryan Chesin; Assistant director of college scouting - Dave Bratten; Senior Director of Football Technology & Research - Tony Lazzaro; Director of football analytics - Scott Flaska; Senior personnel executive – Roman Phifer; Senior personnel executive – Nick Schiralli; Head coaches: Head coach – Sean Payton; Assistant to the head coach – Paul Kelly; Offensive coaches: Offensive coordinator – Joe Lombardi; Offensive pass game coordinator/quarterbacks – Davis Webb; Running backs – Lou Ayeni; Wide receivers – Keary Colbert; Tight ends – Austin King; Offensive run game coordinator/assistant head coach – Zach Strief; Assistant offensive line – Chris Morgan; Director of game management/offensive line assistant – Evan Rothstein; Senior offensive assistant – Pete Carmichael; Passing game specialist – Zack Grossi; Offensive quality control – Logan Kilgore; Offensive quality control – Favian Upshaw	Defensive coaches: Defensive coordinator – Vance Joseph; Defensive line – Jamar Cain; Linebackers – Isaac Shewmaker; Inside Linebackers – Jeff Schmedding; Defensive pass game coordinator/assistant head coach – Jim Leonhard; Cornerbacks – Addison Lynch; Senior defensive assistant – Joe Vitt; Defensive quality control – Todd Davis; Defensive quality control – Brian Niedermeyer; Special teams coaches: Special teams coordinator/assistant head coach – Darren Rizzi; Assistant special teams – Marwan Maalouf; Special teams quality control – Zach Line; Strength and conditioning: Vice president of player health and performance – Beau Lowery; Director of strength and conditioning – Shaun Snee; Head strength and conditioning – Dan Dalrymple; Assistant strength and conditioning – Korey Jones; Assistant strength and conditioning – Taylor Porter

== Final roster ==
2025 Denver Broncos roster
Quarterbacks (QB): 4 Sam Ehlinger; 8 Jarrett Stidham; Running backs (RB): 28 Tyler Badie; 12 RJ Harvey; 38 Jaleel McLaughlin; 46 Adam Prentice; Wide receivers (WR): 13 Pat Bryant; 11 Troy Franklin; 17 Lil'Jordan Humphrey; 19 Marvin Mims; 14 Courtland Sutton; Tight ends (TE): 45 Nate Adkins; 1 Evan Engram; 82 Adam Trautman	Offensive linemen (OL): 72 Garett Bolles T; 73 Frank Crum T; 54 Alex Forsyth C; 69 Mike McGlinchey T; 77 Quinn Meinerz G; 61 Sam Mustipher C; 63 Alex Palczewski G; 74 Ben Powers G; 60 Luke Wattenberg C; Defensive linemen (DL): 99 Zach Allen DE; 98 John Franklin-Myers DE; 94 Jordan Jackson DE; 93 D. J. Jones NT; 95 Sai'vion Jones DE; 97 Malcolm Roach NT; 96 Eyioma Uwazurike DE	Linebackers (LB): 15 Nik Bonitto OLB; 0 Jonathon Cooper OLB; 52 Jonah Elliss OLB; 57 Dre Greenlaw ILB; 47 Karene Reid ILB; 51 Que Robinson OLB; 49 Alex Singleton ILB; 40 Justin Strnad ILB; 92 Dondrea Tillman OLB; 55 Jordan Turner ILB; Defensive backs (DB): 31 Kris Abrams-Draine CB; 23 Jahdae Barron CB; 9 Talanoa Hufanga SS; 26 Devon Key FS; 6 P. J. Locke FS; 29 Ja'Quan McMillian CB; 21 Riley Moss CB; 34 JL Skinner SS; 2 Patrick Surtain II CB; 35 Reese Taylor CB; Special teams (ST): 16 Jeremy Crawshaw P; 48 Mitchell Fraboni LS; 3 Wil Lutz K	Practice squad: 56 Levelle Bailey ILB; 83 Michael Bandy WR; 75 Geron Christian T; 5 Ben DiNucci QB; 36 Brandon Johnson WR; 89 Marcedes Lewis TE; 84 Caleb Lohner TE; 30 Tanner McCalister SS; 90 Jordan Miller NT; 81 Elijah Moore WR; 86 Patrick Murtagh TE (IPP); 87 A. T. Perry WR; 33 Jaden Robinson CB; 80 Kyrese Rowan WR; 25 Cody Schrader RB; 76 Calvin Throckmorton G; 32 Delarrin Turner-Yell FS (PS/I); 42 Deuce Vaughn RB; Reserve: 20 Michael Burton FB (IR); 27 J. K. Dobbins RB (IR/DFR); 66 Nick Gargiulo G (IR); 91 Matt Henningsen DE (IR); 22 Brandon Jones FS (IR); 85 Lucas Krull TE (IR/DFR); 10 Bo Nix QB (IR); 79 Matt Peart G/T (IR); 41 Drew Sanders ILB (IR/DFR); 59 Johnny Walker Jr. OLB (IR); Rookies in italics 53 active, 10 reserve, 17 practice squad (1 exempt)

== Preseason ==
Week	Date	Opponent	Result	Record	Venue	Recap
1	August 9	at San Francisco 49ers	W 30–9	1–0	Levi's Stadium	Recap
2	August 16	Arizona Cardinals	W 27–7	2–0	Empower Field at Mile High	Recap
3	August 23	at New Orleans Saints	W 28–19	3–0	Caesars Superdome	Recap

== Regular season ==
=== Schedule ===
Week	Date	Opponent	Result	Record	Venue	Recap
1	September 7	Tennessee Titans	**W** 20–12	1–0	Empower Field at Mile High	Recap
2	September 14	at Indianapolis Colts	**L** 28–29	1–1	Lucas Oil Stadium	Recap
3	September 21	at **Los Angeles Chargers**	**L** 20–23	1–2	SoFi Stadium	Recap
4	September 29	Cincinnati Bengals	**W** 28–3	2–2	Empower Field at Mile High	Recap
5	October 5	at Philadelphia Eagles	**W** 21–17	3–2	Lincoln Financial Field	Recap
6	October 12	at New York Jets	**W** 13–11	4–2	(United Kingdom) Tottenham Hotspur Stadium (London)	Recap
7	October 19	New York Giants	**W** 33–32	5–2	Empower Field at Mile High	Recap
8	October 26	Dallas Cowboys	**W** 44–24	6–2	Empower Field at Mile High	Recap
9	November 2	at Houston Texans	**W** 18–15	7–2	NRG Stadium	Recap
10	November 6	**Las Vegas Raiders**	**W** 10–7	8–2	Empower Field at Mile High	Recap
11	November 16	**Kansas City Chiefs**	**W** 22–19	9–2	Empower Field at Mile High	Recap
12	Bye					
13	November 30	at Washington Commanders	**W** 27–26 (OT)	10–2	Northwest Stadium	Recap
14	December 7	at **Las Vegas Raiders**	**W** 24–17	11–2	Allegiant Stadium	Recap
15	December 14	Green Bay Packers	**W** 34–26	12–2	Empower Field at Mile High	Recap
16	December 21	Jacksonville Jaguars	**L** 20–34	12–3	Empower Field at Mile High	Recap
17	December 25	at **Kansas City Chiefs**	**W** 20–13	13–3	Arrowhead Stadium	Recap
18	January 4	**Los Angeles Chargers**	**W** 19–3	14–3	Empower Field at Mile High	Recap

Note: Intra-division opponents are in bold text.

=== Game summaries ===
==== Week 1: vs. Tennessee Titans ====
Week 1: Tennessee Titans at Denver Broncos – Game summary

Quarter	1	2	3	4	Total
Titans	3	6	3	0	**12**
**Broncos**	3	7	3	7	**20**

at Empower Field at Mile High, Denver, Colorado

- Date: September 7
- Game time: 2:05 p.m. MDT
- Game weather: Mostly sunny, 84 °F (29 °C)
- Game attendance: 73,747
- Referee: Alex Kemp
- TV announcers (Fox): Adam Amin, Mark Sanchez and Kristina Pink
- Recap, Game Book

Game information

**First quarter**

- TEN – Joey Slye 50-yard field goal, 11:58. Titans 3–0. **Drive: 7 plays, 33 yards, 3:02.**
- DEN – Wil Lutz 39-yard field goal, 8:35. Tied 3–3. **Drive: 10 plays, 44 yards, 3:23.**

**Second quarter**

- TEN – Joey Slye 33-yard field goal, 2:16. Titans 6–3. **Drive: 8 plays, 23 yards, 4:47.**
- DEN – Courtland Sutton 22-yard pass from Bo Nix (Wil Lutz kick), 0:16. Broncos 10–6. **Drive: 1 play, 38 yards, 0:11.**
- TEN – Joey Slye 42-yard field goal, 0:02. Broncos 10–9. **Drive: 1 play, 0 yards, 0:14.**

**Third quarter**

- TEN – Joey Slye 35-yard field goal, 11:56. Titans 12–10. **Drive: 4 plays, 9 yards, 2:09.**
- DEN – Wil Lutz 33-yard field goal, 4:17. Broncos 13–12. **Drive: 13 plays, 48 yards, 7:39.**

**Fourth quarter**

- DEN – J. K. Dobbins 19-yard run (Wil Lutz kick), 7:37. Broncos 20–12. **Drive: 4 plays, 80 yards, 1:45.**

**Top passers**

- TEN – Cam Ward – 12/28, 112 yards
- DEN – Bo Nix – 25/40, 176 yards, TD, 2 INT

**Top rushers**

- TEN – Tony Pollard – 18 rushes, 60 yards
- DEN – RJ Harvey – 6 rushes, 70 yards

**Top receivers**

- TEN – Tony Pollard – 1 reception, 29 yards
- DEN – Courtland Sutton – 6 receptions, 61 yards, TD

Prior to the two-minute warning, all of the scoring came by way of the placekickers—50- and 33-yard field goals by the Titans' Joey Slye and a 39-yarder by the Broncos' Wil Lutz. The second Titans' field goal occurred after Broncos' quarterback Bo Nix was strip-sacked. The Broncos took a 10–6 lead with only 27 second before halftime, with Nix throwing a 22-yard touchdown pass to wide receiver Courtland Sutton. However, Titans' return specialist Chimere Dike returned the ensuing kickoff to the Broncos' 24-yard line, which set up Slye's third field goal—a 42-yarder just before halftime. Following a Nix interception on the second play of the third quarter, Slye's fourth field goal of the game from 35 yards out gave the Titans a 12–10 lead. The Broncos marched down the field on their next possession, but had to settle on a 33-yard field goal by Lutz. This gave the Broncos a lead in which they would not relinquish. After Broncos' return specialist Marvin Mims muffed a punt early in the fourth quarter, the Titans had a short field at the Broncos' 24-yard line. However, Titans rookie quarterback Cam Ward was sacked on two consecutive plays, which would push the Titans out of field goal range. Four plays later, Broncos' running back J. K. Dobbins rushed for a 19-yard touchdown, giving the Broncos a 20–12 lead midway through the fourth quarter. The Broncos' defense forced a three-and-out on the Titans' next two possessions. With only 47 seconds left in the game, and after the Titans exhausted all of their team timeouts, Ward was strip-sacked on 4th-and-10 to seal the Broncos' win. The Broncos' defense held the Titans to –2 net yards in the second half and recorded six sacks of Ward.

==== Week 2: at Indianapolis Colts ====
Week 2: Denver Broncos at Indianapolis Colts – Game summary

Quarter	1	2	3	4	Total
Broncos	7	14	7	0	**28**
**Colts**	6	14	3	6	**29**

at Lucas Oil Stadium, Indianapolis, Indiana

- Date: September 14
- Game time: 4:05 p.m. EDT/2:05 p.m. MDT
- Game weather: None (retractable roof closed)
- Game attendance: 63,910
- Referee: Craig Wrolstad
- TV announcers (CBS): Kevin Harlan, Trent Green and Melanie Collins
- Recap, Game Book

Game information

**First quarter**

- IND – Spencer Shrader 29-yard field goal, 11:51. Colts 3–0. **Drive: 9 plays, 61 yards, 3:09.**
- DEN – Marvin Mims 23-yard pass from Bo Nix (Wil Lutz kick), 8:24. Broncos 7–3. **Drive: 6 plays, 64 yards, 3:27.**
- IND – Spencer Shrader 33-yard field goal, 4:19. Broncos 7–6. **Drive: 8 plays, 55 yards, 4:05.**

**Second quarter**

- IND – Daniel Jones 1-yard run (Spencer Shrader kick), 14:12. Colts 13–7. **Drive: 7 plays, 85 yards, 3:30.**
- DEN – Troy Franklin 3-yard pass from Bo Nix (Wil Lutz kick), 10:42. Broncos 14–13. **Drive: 7 plays, 67 yards, 3:30.**
- DEN – Adam Trautman 2-yard pass from Bo Nix (Wil Lutz kick), 3:03. Broncos 21–13. **Drive: 10 plays, 50 yards, 4:25.**
- IND – Jonathan Taylor 7-yard pass from Daniel Jones (Spencer Shrader kick), 1:31. Broncos 21–20. **Drive: 6 plays, 81 yards, 1:32.**

**Third quarter**

- DEN – J. K. Dobbins 5-yard run (Wil Lutz kick), 11:13. Broncos 28–20. **Drive: 7 plays, 60 yards, 3:47.**
- IND – Spencer Shrader 36-yard field goal, 5:42. Broncos 28–23. **Drive: 10 plays, 42 yards, 5:31.**

**Fourth quarter**

- IND – Spencer Shrader 28-yard field goal, 8:33. Broncos 28–26. **Drive: 7 plays, 81 yards, 2:52.**
- IND – Spencer Shrader 45-yard field goal, 0:00. Colts 29–28. **Drive: 9 plays, 41 yards, 3:15.**

**Top passers**

- DEN – Bo Nix – 22/30, 206 yards, 3 TD, INT
- IND – Daniel Jones – 23/34, 316 yards, TD

**Top rushers**

- DEN – J. K. Dobbins – 14 rushes, 76 yards, TD
- IND – Jonathan Taylor – 25 rushes, 165 yards

**Top receivers**

- DEN – Troy Franklin – 8 receptions, 89 yards, TD
- IND – Tyler Warren – 4 receptions, 79 yards

After a strong performance against the Titans, the Broncos' defense struggled against the Colts, failing to force a punt and surrendering five field goals to placekicker Spencer Shrader. The defense also allowed Colts' quarterback Daniel Jones to pass for 316 yards, rush for one touchdown and pass for another. Three touchdown passes by quarterback Bo Nix and a 5-yard rushing touchdown by running back J. K. Dobbins gave the Broncos a 28–20 lead at the 11:13 mark of the third quarter. However, the Broncos would be held scoreless for the remainder of the game. After Nix was intercepted deep in Colts' territory, a 28-yard field goal by Schrader narrowed the Broncos' lead to 28–26 early in the fourth quarter. Broncos' placekicker Wil Lutz hit the right upright on a 42-yard field goal attempt with 3:19 remaining in the game, and the Colts had one last offensive possession. With three seconds left in the game, Schrader missed short on a 60-yard field goal attempt; however, Broncos' linebacker Dondrea Tillman was flagged for a 15-yard leverage penalty, giving Schrader another opportunity. Schrader kicked the game-winning 45-yard field goal on an untimed down.

==== Week 3: at Los Angeles Chargers ====
Week 3: Denver Broncos at Los Angeles Chargers – Game summary

Quarter	1	2	3	4	Total
Broncos	0	7	10	3	**20**
**Chargers**	3	7	3	10	**23**

at SoFi Stadium, Inglewood, California

- Date: September 21
- Game time: 2:05 p.m. MDT/1:05 p.m. PDT
- Game weather: Cloudy, 76 °F (24 °C) (fixed roof)
- Game attendance: 70,740
- Referee: Shawn Smith
- TV announcers (CBS): Kevin Harlan, Trent Green and Melanie Collins
- Recap, Game Book

Game information

**First quarter**

- LAC – Cameron Dicker 32-yard field goal, 11:54. Chargers 3–0. **Drive: 8 plays, 56 yards, 3:06.**

**Second quarter**

- LAC – Omarion Hampton 3-yard run (Cameron Dicker kick), 1:53. Chargers 10–0. **Drive: 9 plays, 54 yards, 3:57.**
- DEN – Courtland Sutton 52-yard pass from Bo Nix (Wil Lutz kick), 0:38. Chargers 10–7. **Drive: 7 plays, 72 yards, 1:15.**

**Third quarter**

- DEN – J. K. Dobbins 19-yard run (Wil Lutz kick), 13:40. Broncos 14–10. **Drive: 3 plays, 66 yards, 1:20.**
- DEN – Wil Lutz 42-yard field goal, 12:02. Broncos 17–10. **Drive: 4 plays, 6 yards, 1:30.**
- LAC – Cameron Dicker 24-yard field goal, 5:35. Broncos 17–13. **Drive: 14 plays, 69 yards, 6:27.**

**Fourth quarter**

- DEN – Wil Lutz 26-yard field goal, 12:21. Broncos 20–13. **Drive: 10 plays, 51 yards, 4:50.**
- LAC – Keenan Allen 20-yard pass from Justin Herbert (Cameron Dicker kick), 2:37. Tied 20–20. **Drive: 7 plays, 76 yards, 2:31.**
- LAC – Cameron Dicker 43-yard field goal, 0:00. Chargers 23–20. **Drive: 8 plays, 43 yards, 1:43.**

**Top passers**

- DEN – Bo Nix – 14/25, 153 yards, TD
- LAC – Justin Herbert – 28/47, 300 yards, TD, INT

**Top rushers**

- DEN – J. K. Dobbins – 11 rushes, 83 yards, TD
- LAC – Omarion Hampton – 19 rushes, 70 yards, TD

**Top receivers**

- DEN – Courtland Sutton – 6 receptions, 118 yards, TD
- LAC – Quentin Johnston – 6 receptions, 89 yards

The Broncos spotted the Chargers a 10–0 lead, after a 32-yard field goal by placekicker Cameron Dicker, followed in the second quarter by a 3-yard touchdown run by running back Omarion Hampton. The Broncos then scored 17 unanswered points, and got on the scoreboard just before halftime, with quarterback Bo Nix launching a 52-yard touchdown pass to wide receiver Courtland Sutton. A 19-yard touchdown run by running back J. K. Dobbins and a 42-yard field goal by placekicker Wil Lutz gave the Broncos a 17–10 lead. After a 24-yard field goal by Dicker narrowed the Broncos' lead to 17–13, Lutz responded with a 26-yarder early in the fourth quarter. The Broncos went three-and out on their next offensive possession, and Chargers' quarterback Justin Herbert connected on a 20-yard touchdown pass to wide receiver Keenan Allen to tie the score at 20–20 with 2:37 remaining in the game. The Broncos had a chance to get in field goal range, but Nix overthrew Sutton on a critical third down pass play on the first play from scrimmage after the two-minute warning, forcing the Broncos to punt. Herbert then engineered a game-winning drive, culminating in a 43-yard field goal by Dicker as time expired. It was the second consecutive week in which the Broncos were victimized by a game-ending field goal.

==== Week 4: vs. Cincinnati Bengals ====
Week 4: Cincinnati Bengals at Denver Broncos – Game summary

Quarter	1	2	3	4	Total
Bengals	3	0	0	0	**3**
**Broncos**	7	14	0	7	**28**

at Empower Field at Mile High, Denver, Colorado

- Date: September 29
- Game time: 6:15 p.m. MDT
- Game weather: Partly cloudy, 65 °F (18 °C)
- Game attendance: 75,673
- Referee: Alex Moore
- TV announcers (ABC): Joe Buck, Troy Aikman, Lisa Salters and Laura Rutledge
- Recap, Game Book

Game information

**First quarter**

- CIN – Evan McPherson 26-yard field goal, 9:08. Bengals 3–0. **Drive: 12 plays, 62 yards, 5:52.**
- DEN – Bo Nix 6-yard run (Wil Lutz kick), 0:17. Broncos 7–3. **Drive: 9 plays, 64 yards, 4:07.**

**Second quarter**

- DEN – Marvin Mims 16-yard run (Wil Lutz kick), 8:48. Broncos 14–3. **Drive: 8 plays, 80 yards, 3:04.**
- DEN – Courtland Sutton 20-yard pass from Bo Nix (Wil Lutz kick), 0:08. Broncos 21–3. **Drive: 9 plays, 80 yards, 1:01.**

**Third quarter**

- No scoring plays

**Fourth quarter**

- DEN – RJ Harvey 12-yard pass from Bo Nix (Wil Lutz kick), 4:58. Broncos 28–3. **Drive: 10 plays, 76 yards, 6:11.**

**Top passers**

- CIN – Jake Browning – 14/25, 125 yards
- DEN – Bo Nix – 29/42, 326 yards, 2 TD, INT

**Top rushers**

- CIN – Chase Brown – 10 rushes, 40 yards
- DEN – J. K. Dobbins – 16 rushes, 101 yards

**Top receivers**

- CIN – Tee Higgins – 3 receptions, 32 yards
- DEN – Courtland Sutton – 5 receptions, 81 yards, TD

After allowing a 26-yard field goal by Bengals' placekicker Evan McPherson on the game's opening drive, the Broncos' defense held the Bengals scoreless for the remainder of the game. The Broncos' defense also recorded three sacks of Bengals' quarterback Jake Browning, who was playing in place of the injured Joe Burrow. On the offensive side of the football, quarterback Bo Nix accounted for three of the Broncos' four touchdowns—two passing and one rushing—and wide receiver Marvin Mims rushed for the other touchdown. J. K. Dobbins became the first Broncos' running back to rush for 100 yards since Week 18 of the 2022 season.

==== Week 5: at Philadelphia Eagles ====
Week 5: Denver Broncos at Philadelphia Eagles – Game summary

Quarter	1	2	3	4	Total
**Broncos**	3	0	0	18	**21**
Eagles	3	7	7	0	**17**

at Lincoln Financial Field, Philadelphia, Pennsylvania

- Date: October 5
- Game time: 1:00 p.m. EDT/11:00 a.m. MDT
- Game weather: Sunny, 80 °F (27 °C)
- Game attendance: 69,879
- Referee: Adrian Hill
- TV announcers (CBS): Jim Nantz, Tony Romo and Tracy Wolfson
- Recap, Game Book

Game information

**First quarter**

- DEN – Wil Lutz 55-yard field goal, 6:49. Broncos 3–0. **Drive: 12 plays, 32 yards, 5:19.**
- PHI – Jake Elliott 31-yard field goal, 0:29. Tied 3–3. **Drive: 12 plays, 70 yards, 6:20.**

**Second quarter**

- PHI – Dallas Goedert 2-yard pass from Jalen Hurts (Jake Elliott kick), 7:20. Eagles 10–3. **Drive: 7 plays, 90 yards, 4:32.**

**Third quarter**

- PHI – Saquon Barkley 47-yard pass from Jalen Hurts (Jake Elliott kick), 13:23. Eagles 17–3. **Drive: 4 plays, 74 yards, 1:37.**

**Fourth quarter**

- DEN – J. K. Dobbins 2-yard run (Wil Lutz kick), 13:11. Eagles 17–10. **Drive: 10 plays, 64 yards, 4:27.**
- DEN – Evan Engram 11-yard pass from Bo Nix (Bo Nix–Troy Franklin pass), 7:36. Broncos 18–17. **Drive: 6 plays, 72 yards, 3:32.**
- DEN – Wil Lutz 36-yard field goal, 1:11. Broncos 21–17. **Drive: 11 plays, 50 yards, 3:49.**

**Top passers**

- DEN – Bo Nix – 24/39, 242 yards, TD
- PHI – Jalen Hurts – 23/38, 280 yards, 2 TD

**Top rushers**

- DEN – J. K. Dobbins – 20 rushes, 79 yards, TD
- PHI – Saquon Barkley – 6 rushes, 30 yards

**Top receivers**

- DEN – Courtland Sutton – 8 receptions, 99 yards
- PHI – Devonta Smith – 8 receptions, 114 yards

A 55-yard field goal by placekicker Wil Lutz got the Broncos on the scoreboard midway through the first quarter. The Broncos caught a break, after a fumble by quarterback Bo Nix was overturned by a booth review. However, the Eagles would score 17 unanswered points and the Broncos were forced to punt on their next six possessions. First, a 31-yard field goal by placekicker Jake Elliott got the Eagles on the scoreboard late in the first quarter. Then, quarterback Jalen Hurts tossed a pair of touchdown passes—a 2-yarder to tight end Dallas Goedert midway through the second quarter, followed by a 47-yarder to running back Saquon Barkley on the opening possession of the third quarter. The Broncos' defense held the Eagles scoreless for the remainder of the game, and the offense did not reach the red zone until early in the fourth quarter, when running back J. K. Dobbins rushed for a 2-yard touchdown. After forcing an Eagles' punt, Nix connected on an 11-yard touchdown pass to tight end Evan Engram. Instead of a game-tying extra point, the Broncos opted for a successful two-point conversion pass from Nix to wide receiver Troy Franklin that gave the Broncos an 18–17 lead with 7:43 remaining in the game.

The Eagles faced a 4th-and-4 near midfield on their next possession, and Hurts connected on a long pass play to wide receiver DeVonta Smith to the Broncos' 21-yard line. However, an illegal shift penalty on Barkley negated the 4th-down conversion, forcing a punt. The Broncos then drove down the field and forced the Eagles to use all of their team timeouts. A 36-yard field goal by Lutz gave the Broncos a 21–17 lead with only 1:14 remaining in the game. The drive was extended as the result a 15-yard unnecessary roughness penalty on Eagles' linebacker Zack Baun, after Broncos' running back RJ Harvey was stopped just short of a first down on a 3rd-and-2 at the Eagles' 29-yard line. After Broncos' safety JL Skinner was flagged for pass interference on a 4th-down play near midfield, the Eagles had one last play at the Broncos 29-yard line with three seconds remaining. Hurts' hail mary pass into the back of the end zone intended for wide receivers Smith and A. J. Brown was well defended by several Broncos' defenders, falling incomplete as time expired to seal the upset. The Broncos' defense recorded six sacks of Hurts, and the Broncos won in Philadelphia for only the second time in eight tries—their only other road win over the Eagles was a 33–7 victory in 1986.

With the win, the Broncos snapped the Eagles’ 10-game overall winning streak and their 12-game home winning streak, handing Philadelphia its first loss of the season. Additionally, head coach Sean Payton surpassed Bill Parcells and tied for 14th on the NFL’s all-time head coaching wins list.

==== Week 6: at New York Jets ====
NFL London games

Week 6: Denver Broncos at New York Jets – Game summary

Quarter	1	2	3	4	Total
**Broncos**	10	0	0	3	**13**
Jets	6	0	5	0	**11**

at Tottenham Hotspur Stadium, London, England

- Date: October 12
- Game time: 2:30 p.m. BST/7:30 a.m. MDT
- Game weather: Mostly sunny, 59 °F (15 °C)
- Game attendance: 61,155
- Referee: Land Clark
- TV announcers (NFLN): Rich Eisen, Kurt Warner and Sara Walsh
- Recap, Game Book

Game information

**First quarter**

- NYJ – Nick Folk 52-yard field goal, 11:00. Jets 3–0. **Drive: 4 plays, 3 yards, 2:22.**
- DEN – Wil Lutz 57-yard field goal, 7:03. Tied 3–3. **Drive: 7 plays, 23 yards, 3:57.**
- NYJ – Nick Folk 41-yard field goal, 4:55. Jets 6–3. **Drive: 4 plays, 1 yard, 2:08.**
- DEN – Nate Adkins 16-yard pass from Bo Nix (Wil Lutz kick), 0:00. Broncos 10–6. **Drive: 9 plays, 69 yards, 4:55.**

**Second quarter**

- No scoring plays

**Third quarter**

- NYJ – Nick Folk 38-yard field goal, 10:25. Broncos 10–9. **Drive: 10 plays, 37 yards, 4:35.**
- NYJ – Penalty on Garett Bolles enforced in the end zone for a safety, 4:56. Jets 11–10.

**Fourth quarter**

- DEN – Wil Lutz 27-yard field goal, 5:06. Broncos 13–11. **Drive: 12 plays, 65 yards, 5:10.**

**Top passers**

- DEN – Bo Nix – 19/30, 174 yards, TD
- NYJ – Justin Fields – 9/17, 45 yards

**Top rushers**

- DEN – J. K. Dobbins – 14 rushes, 40 yards
- NYJ – Breece Hall – 22 rushes, 59 yards

**Top receivers**

- DEN – Evan Engram – 5 receptions, 42 yards
- NYJ – Josh Reynolds – 3 receptions, 25 yards

The game began with an exchange of field goals by both placekickers—52- and 41-yarders by the Jets' Nick Folk, and a 57-yarder by the Broncos' Wil Lutz in between. The Jets' first field goal occurred after a Broncos' fumble, and the second field goal was set up by a 72-yard kickoff return by return specialist Kene Nwangwu. The Broncos took a 10–6 lead at the end of the first quarter, with the game's only touchdown—a 16-yard pass from quarterback Bo Nix to tight end Nate Adkins. Following a scoreless second quarter, a 38-yard field goal by Folk on the opening possession of the third quarter narrowed the Broncos' lead to 10–9. Following an exchange of punts, the Broncos were backed up to their own goal line, and the Jets took an 11–10 lead, after Broncos' tackle Garett Bolles was penalized for offensive holding in the end zone, resulting in a safety. Following a defensive struggle, the Broncos re-claimed the lead, with a 27-yard field goal by Lutz with 5:09 remaining in the game. Both teams went three-and-out on their next offensive possessions, and the Jets had one last possession at their own 43-yard line with 2:23 remaining in the game. After five plays, the Jets' faced a 4th-and-8 at the Broncos' 44-yard line; however, quarterback Justin Fields was sacked, ending the Jets' rally attempt. The Broncos' defense recorded nine sacks on Fields, and held the Jets to just 82 total net yards on offense. The Broncos also limited the Jets to −10 net passing yards, setting a franchise record for the fewest passing yards allowed in a single game. It was the lowest total by any NFL team since the San Diego Chargers recorded −19 passing yards against the Kansas City Chiefs in 1998.

==== Week 7: vs. New York Giants ====
Week 7: New York Giants at Denver Broncos – Game summary

Quarter	1	2	3	4	Total
Giants	7	6	6	13	**32**
**Broncos**	0	0	0	33	**33**

at Empower Field at Mile High, Denver, Colorado

- Date: October 19
- Game time: 2:05 p.m. MDT
- Game weather: Partly cloudy, 72 °F (22 °C)
- Game attendance: 75,788
- Referee: Brad Allen
- TV announcers (CBS): Kevin Harlan, Trent Green and Melanie Collins
- Recap, Game Book

Game information

**First quarter**

- NYG – Daniel Bellinger 44-yard pass from Jaxson Dart (Jude McAtamney kick), 6:54. Giants 7–0. **Drive: 4 plays, 77 yards, 1:31.**

**Second quarter**

- NYG – Cameron Skattebo 13-yard pass from Jaxson Dart (kick failed), 8:46. Giants 13–0. **Drive: 10 plays, 82 yards, 5:59.**

**Third quarter**

- NYG – Tyrone Tracy Jr. 31-yard run (pass failed), 2:41. Giants 19–0. **Drive: 7 plays, 59 yards, 3:23.**

**Fourth quarter**

- DEN – Troy Franklin 2-yard pass from Bo Nix (Bo Nix–Courtland Sutton pass), 14:08. Giants 19–8. **Drive: 8 plays, 78 yards, 3:33.**
- NYG – Theo Johnson 41-yard pass from Jaxson Dart (Jude McAtamney kick), 10:14. Giants 26–8. **Drive: 6 plays, 67 yards, 3:54.**
- DEN – Bo Nix 7-yard run (Bo Nix–Troy Franklin pass), 5:13. Giants 26–16. **Drive: 13 plays, 74 yards, 5:01.**
- DEN – RJ Harvey 2-yard pass from Bo Nix (Wil Lutz kick), 3:51. Giants 26–23. **Drive: 4 plays, 19 yards, 0:56.**
- DEN – Bo Nix 18-yard run (Wil Lutz kick), 1:51. Broncos 30–26. **Drive: 6 plays, 68 yards, 0:51.**
- NYG – Jaxson Dart 1-yard run (kick failed), 0:37. Giants 32–30. **Drive: 7 plays, 65 yards, 1:14.**
- DEN – Wil Lutz 39-yard field goal, 0:00. Broncos 33–32. **Drive: 4 plays, 56 yards, 0:37.**

**Top passers**

- NYG – Jaxson Dart – 15/33, 283 yards, 3 TD, INT
- DEN – Bo Nix – 27/50, 279 yards, 2 TD

**Top rushers**

- NYG – Cameron Skattebo – 16 rushes, 60 yards
- DEN – J. K. Dobbins – 14 rushes, 81 yards

**Top receivers**

- NYG – Wan'Dale Robinson – 6 receptions, 95 yards
- DEN – Courtland Sutton – 6 receptions, 87 yard

The Broncos' offense struggled through the first three quarters, failing to cross midfield on seven of their first eight possessions. The only exception was a 13-play, 64-yard drive, in which the Broncos' failed to convert a 4th-and-goal at the Giants' 2-yard line. Giants' rookie quarterback Jaxson Dart connected on two touchdown passes—a 44-yarder to tight end Daniel Bellinger in the first quarter, followed in the second quarter by a 13-yarder to running back Cameron Skattebo. However, placekicker Jude McAtamney missed wide-left on the extra point attempt. The Giants added to their lead at the 2:47 mark of the third quarter, with a 31-yard touchdown run by running back Tyrone Tracy Jr.; however, the two-point conversion attempt was unsuccessful, leaving the score at 19–0.

The Broncos then started their monumental comeback, and finally got on the scoreboard early in the fourth quarter, with quarterback Bo Nix completing a short 2-yard touchdown pass to wide receiver Troy Franklin, coupled with a successful 2-point conversion pass from Nix to wide receiver Courtland Sutton. The Giants responded on their next possession, with a 41-yard touchdown pass from Dart to tight end Theo Johnson. The Broncos subsequently cut into the Giants' lead, with Nix scrambling right for a 7-yard touchdown, coupled with another successful two-point conversion—from Nix to Franklin—with 5:19 remaining in the game. On the third play of the Giants' next possession, Dart was intercepted by Broncos' linebacker Justin Strnad deep in Giants territory. The Broncos capitalized on the turnover four plays later, with a 2-yard touchdown pass from Nix to running back RJ Harvey. After the Broncos' defense forced a three-and-out of the Giants' offense, the Broncos took their first lead just after the two-minute warning, with Nix scrambling left for an 18-yard touchdown. The Giants quickly responded, and with only 40 seconds left, Dart dove into the end zone for a 1-yard touchdown. However, McAtamney missed another extra point attempt, leaving the Giants with a 32–30 lead. McAtamney's two missed extra points, coupled with the unsuccessful 2-point conversion attempt after their third touchdown, would all prove costly. With no timeouts, Nix engineered a game-winning drive, reaching the Giants' 21-yard line and a clock-stopping spike with only three seconds left. Placekicker Wil Lutz kicked the game-winning 39-yard field goal as time expired, capping off a 33-point scoring output in the fourth quarter.

The Broncos' stunning comeback snapped an NFL-record streak of 1,602 consecutive wins by teams leading by 18 or more points in the final six minutes of a game. Trailing 26–8 with 6:38 remaining and facing a fourth-and-3, the Broncos' win probability dropped to as low as 0.7% according to Next Gen Stats. Denver's 33 points in the fourth quarter are the most in NFL history by any team that had been shut out through the first three quarters. Quarterback Bo Nix became the first player in league history to run for two touchdowns and throw for two more in a single fourth quarter. The Broncos' 33-point quarter was the second-highest in NFL history, behind only a 34-point performance by the Lions in the 2007 season.

==== Week 8: vs. Dallas Cowboys ====
Week 8: Dallas Cowboys at Denver Broncos – Game summary

Quarter	1	2	3	4	Total
Cowboys	3	7	7	7	**24**
**Broncos**	14	13	3	14	**44**

at Empower Field at Mile High, Denver, Colorado

- Date: October 26
- Game time: 2:25 p.m. MDT
- Game weather: Cloudy, 67 °F (19 °C)
- Game attendance: 75,877
- Referee: Carl Cheffers
- TV announcers (CBS): Jim Nantz, Tony Romo and Tracy Wolfson
- Recap, Game Book

Game information

**First quarter**

- DAL – Brandon Aubrey 24-yard field goal, 10:34. Cowboys 3–0. **Drive: 8 plays, 46 yards, 3:01.**
- DEN – RJ Harvey 40-yard run (Wil Lutz kick), 8:13. Broncos 7–3. **Drive: 5 plays, 74 yards, 2:21.**
- DEN – Troy Franklin 25-yard pass from Bo Nix (Wil Lutz kick), 3:04. Broncos 14–3. **Drive: 4 plays, 62 yards, 2:39.**

**Second quarter**

- DAL – Javonte Williams 1-yard run (Brandon Aubrey kick), 7:29. Broncos 14–10. **Drive: 11 plays, 59 yards, 6:15.**
- DEN – RJ Harvey 1-yard run (pass failed), 3:47. Broncos 20–10. **Drive: 6 plays, 65 yards, 3:42.**
- DEN – Pat Bryant 24-yard pass from Bo Nix (Wil Lutz kick), 0:39. Broncos 27–10. **Drive: 7 plays, 72 yards, 1:35.**

**Third quarter**

- DAL – Javonte Williams 1-yard run (Brandon Aubrey kick), 8:10. Broncos 27–17. **Drive: 13 plays, 65 yards, 6:50.**
- DEN – Wil Lutz 42-yard field goal, 6:02. Broncos 30–17. **Drive: 5 plays, 22 yards, 2:08.**

**Fourth quarter**

- DEN – Troy Franklin 7-yard pass from Bo Nix (Wil Lutz kick), 12:48. Broncos 37–17. **Drive: 12 plays, 84 yards, 5:30.**
- DEN – RJ Harvey 5-yard pass from Bo Nix (Wil Lutz kick), 7:14. Broncos 44–17. **Drive: 8 plays, 55 yards, 3:01.**
- DAL – Jalen Tolbert 35-yard pass from Joe Milton (Brandon Aubrey kick), 4:44. Broncos 44–24. **Drive: 6 plays, 65 yards, 2:30.**

**Top passers**

- DAL – Dak Prescott – 19/31, 188 yards, 2 INT
- DEN – Bo Nix – 19/29, 247 yards, 4 TD, INT

**Top rushers**

- DAL – Javonte Williams – 13 rushes, 41 yards, 2 TD
- DEN – J. K. Dobbins – 15 rushes, 111 yards

**Top receivers**

- DAL – George Pickens – 7 receptions, 78 yards
- DEN – Troy Franklin – 6 receptions, 89 yards, 2 TD

After an interception by Broncos' quarterback Bo Nix led to an early Cowboys' field goal, the Broncos dominated the remainder of the game. Nix threw four touchdown passes, and running back RJ Harvey scored three touchdowns—two rushing, one receiving. The Cowboys never got any closer than a 10-point deficit in the second half. With the win, the Broncos increased their winning streak over the Cowboys to eight, dating back to 1998, and the Broncos improved to 6–2 for the first time since 2016.

==== Week 9: at Houston Texans ====
Week 9: Denver Broncos at Houston Texans – Game summary

Quarter	1	2	3	4	Total
**Broncos**	0	7	0	11	**18**
Texans	3	9	3	0	**15**

at NRG Stadium, Houston, Texas

- Date: November 2
- Game time: 12:00 p.m. CST/11:00 a.m. MST
- Game weather: None (retractable roof closed)
- Game attendance: 70,471
- Referee: Ron Torbert
- TV announcers (Fox): Kevin Kugler, Daryl Johnston and Allison Williams
- Recap, Game Book

Game information

**First quarter**

- HOU – Ka'imi Fairbairn 23-yard field goal, 0:05. Texans 3–0. **Drive: 8 plays, 54 yards, 4:22.**

**Second quarter**

- HOU – Ka'imi Fairbairn 41-yard field goal, 7:11. Texans 6–0. **Drive: 10 plays, 28 yards, 5:25.**
- DEN – Courtland Sutton 30-yard pass from Bo Nix (Wil Lutz kick), 4:52. Broncos 7–6. **Drive: 7 plays, 70 yards, 2:19.**
- HOU – Ka'imi Fairbairn 38-yard field goal, 1:52. Texans 9–7. **Drive: 9 plays, 53 yards, 3:00.**
- HOU – Ka'imi Fairbairn 40-yard field goal, 0:00. Texans 12–7. **Drive: 4 plays, 9 yards, 0:39.**

**Third quarter**

- HOU – Ka'imi Fairbairn 41-yard field goal, 9:18. Texans 15–7. **Drive: 6 plays, 24 yards, 2:51.**

**Fourth quarter**

- DEN – RJ Harvey 27-yard pass from Bo Nix (Bo Nix–Troy Franklin pass), 12:28. Tied 15–15. **Drive: 8 plays, 61 yards, 3:51.**
- DEN – Wil Lutz 34-yard field goal, 0:00. Broncos 18–15. **Drive: 6 plays, 48 yards, 0:50.**

**Top passers**

- DEN – Bo Nix – 17/36, 170 yards, 2 TD, INT
- HOU – Davis Mills – 17/30, 137 yards

**Top rushers**

- DEN – J. K. Dobbins – 15 rushes, 61 yards
- HOU – Nick Chubb – 11 rushes, 34 yards

**Top receivers**

- DEN – RJ Harvey – 4 receptions, 48 yards, TD
- HOU – Dalton Schultz – 6 receptions, 77 yards

The game started with unsuccessful field goal attempts by both placekickers—the Texans' Ka'imi Fairbairn missed wide-right on a 51-yard attempt, and the Broncos' Wil Lutz had his 51-yard attempt blocked. Two field goals by Fairbairn—a 23-yarder at the end of the first quarter, followed by a 41-yarder midway through the second quarter—gave the Texans a 6–0 lead. The latter field goal occurred after an interception by Broncos' quarterback Bo Nix. Texans' quarterback C. J. Stroud was knocked out of the game with a concussion prior to the second field goal, and backup quarterback Davis Mills took over for the remainder of the game. The Broncos got on the scoreboard, with Nix throwing a 30-yard touchdown pass to wide receiver Courtland Sutton. A 38-yard field goal by Fairbairn just after the two-minute warning gave the lead back to the Texans, and after Broncos' return specialist Michael Bandy muffed a punt, Fairbairn added a 40-yard field goal at the end of the first half. The Broncos' offense struggled against the Texans' No. 1-ranked defense, going three-and-out on two of their three third quarter possessions. Fairbairn's fifth field goal of the game—a 41-yarder midway through the third quarter—gave the Texans a 15–7 lead, which would be the final scoring play that the Broncos' defense would allow for the remainder of the game. The Broncos reached the end zone early in the fourth quarter, with Nix connecting on a 27-yard touchdown pass to running back RJ Harvey, followed by a successful two-point conversion to wide receiver Troy Franklin—to tie the score at 15–15. Following an exchange of punts, the Broncos started their final possession of the game at their own 36-yard line with only 50 seconds remaining in the game. The Broncos reached the Texans' 16-yard line in five plays, keyed by two scrambles by Nix totaling 41 yards, and in the process, forcing the Texans to use the last two of their three team timeouts. This set up Lutz with the game-winning 34-yard field goal as time expired.

With their third comeback victory of the season, the Broncos improved to their first 7–2 start since 2015. Tight end Marcedes Lewis made history when, at age 41, he became the oldest tight end ever to play in an NFL game. Additionally, when he entered the game on the fourth snap of the Broncos’ first drive, he also became the oldest player to appear in a game for the franchise in its history.

==== Week 10: vs. Las Vegas Raiders ====
Week 10: Las Vegas Raiders at Denver Broncos – Game summary

Quarter	1	2	3	4	Total
Raiders	7	0	0	0	**7**
**Broncos**	0	7	3	0	**10**

at Empower Field at Mile High, Denver, Colorado

- Date: November 6
- Game time: 6:15 p.m. MST
- Game weather: Partly cloudy, 60 °F (16 °C)
- Game attendance: 74,692
- Referee: Bill Vinovich
- TV announcers (Prime Video): Al Michaels, Kirk Herbstreit and Kaylee Hartung
- Recap, Game Book

Game information

**First quarter**

- LV – Ashton Jeanty 4-yard run (Daniel Carlson kick), 3:02. Raiders 7–0. **Drive: 8 plays, 41 yards, 4:05.**

**Second quarter**

- DEN – Troy Franklin 7-yard pass from Bo Nix (Wil Lutz kick), 2:41. Tied 7–7. **Drive: 5 plays, 53 yards, 3:17.**

**Third quarter**

- DEN – Wil Lutz 32-yard field goal, 0:05. Broncos 10–7. **Drive: 4 plays, -2 yards, 1:24.**

**Fourth quarter**

- No scoring plays

**Top passers**

- LV – Geno Smith – 16/26, 143 yards, INT
- DEN – Bo Nix – 16/28, 150 yards, TD, 2 INT

**Top rushers**

- LV – Ashton Jeanty – 19 rushes, 60 yards, TD
- DEN – J. K. Dobbins – 18 rushes, 77 yards

**Top receivers**

- LV – Tyler Lockett – 5 receptions, 44 yards
- DEN – Pat Bryant – 1 reception, 43 yards

The entire game was a defensive struggle by both teams, with the Broncos and Raiders going a combined 9-for-30 on third down and also featuring numerous penalties. The Raiders took the early lead, with rookie running back Ashton Jeanty rushing for a 4-yard touchdown. It was the only scoring play that the Broncos' defense allowed during the entire game. The Raiders committed two costly penalties that negated two big plays—a 32-yard run by Jeanty that was denied by a holding call late in the first quarter, followed by a 31-yard touchdown pass from quarterback Geno Smith to wide receiver Tre Tucker that was denied by offensive pass interference. The Broncos responded in the second quarter, with a 7-yard touchdown pass from quarterback Bo Nix to wide receiver Troy Franklin. Each placekicker missed a field goal—the Broncos' Wil Lutz missed short on a 59-yard attempt, while the Raiders' Daniel Carlson missed wide-right later on a 48-yard attempt later in the fourth quarter. Late in the third quarter, the Broncos made a crucial special teams play, with safety JL Skinner blocking a punt by the Raiders' AJ Cole deep in Raiders' territory. The Broncos were forced to settle for a 32-yard field goal by Lutz, after losing 2-yards. This gave the Broncos a 10–7 lead, and it was the final scoring play of the game. The Broncos started their final offensive possession of the game with 4:26 left in the game, and proceeded to run out the clock.

==== Week 11: vs. Kansas City Chiefs ====
Week 11: Kansas City Chiefs at Denver Broncos – Game summary

Quarter	1	2	3	4	Total
Chiefs	3	3	7	6	**19**
**Broncos**	6	0	7	9	**22**

at Empower Field at Mile High, Denver, Colorado

- Date: November 16
- Game time: 2:25 p.m. MST
- Game weather: Sunny, 70 °F (21 °C)
- Game attendance: 75,911
- Referee: Adrian Hill
- TV announcers (CBS): Jim Nantz, Tony Romo and Tracy Wolfson
- Recap, Game Book

Game information

**First quarter**

- DEN – Wil Lutz 29-yard field goal, 7:36. Broncos 3–0. **Drive: 14 plays, 54 yards, 7:24.**
- DEN – Wil Lutz 24-yard field goal, 4:53. Broncos 6–0. **Drive: 4 plays, 5 yards, 1:28.**
- KC – Harrison Butker 31-yard field goal, 0:49. Broncos 6–3. **Drive: 9 plays, 59 yards, 4:04.**

**Second quarter**

- KC – Harrison Butker 31-yard field goal, 4:38. Tied 6–6. **Drive: 16 plays, 77 yards, 9:32.**

**Third quarter**

- DEN – Jaleel McLaughlin 4-yard run (Wil Lutz kick), 4:03. Broncos 13–6. **Drive: 11 plays, 89 yards, 6:01.**
- KC – Kareem Hunt 2-yard run (Harrison Butker kick), 0:49. Tied 13–13. **Drive: 6 plays, 75 yards, 3:14.**

**Fourth quarter**

- DEN – Wil Lutz 38-yard field goal, 12:50. Broncos 16–13. **Drive: 8 plays, 60 yards, 2:59.**
- KC – Travis Kelce 21-yard pass from Patrick Mahomes (kick blocked), 9:57. Chiefs 19–16. **Drive: 6 plays, 73 yards, 2:53.**
- DEN – Wil Lutz 54-yard field goal, 4:10. Tied 19–19. **Drive: 6 plays, 19 yards, 2:20.**
- DEN – Wil Lutz 35-yard field goal, 0:00. Broncos 22–19. **Drive: 10 plays, 58 yards, 2:59.**

**Top passers**

- KC – Patrick Mahomes – 29/45, 276 yards, TD, INT
- DEN – Bo Nix – 24/37, 295 yards

**Top rushers**

- KC – Kareem Hunt – 13 rushes, 59 yards, TD
- DEN – RJ Harvey – 11 rushes, 30 yards

**Top receivers**

- KC – Travis Kelce – 9 receptions, 91 yards, TD
- DEN – Troy Franklin – 4 receptions, 84 yards

All of the first half scoring came by way of each placekicker—29- and 24-yard field goals by the Broncos' Wil Lutz, followed by a pair of 31-yard field goals by the Chiefs' Harrison Butker. On the opening possession of the second half, Chiefs' quarterback Patrick Mahomes was intercepted by Broncos' cornerback Ja'Quan McMillian, and the Broncos capitalized 11 plays later, with their only touchdown of the game—a 4-yard run by running back Jaleel McLaughlin. The Chiefs responded, with a 2-yard touchdown by running back Kareem Hunt. After a 38-yard field goal by Lutz gave the Broncos a 16–13 lead early in the fourth quarter, the Chiefs took their first lead of the game, with Mahomes connecting on a 21-yard touchdown pass to tight end Travis Kelce. However, Butker's extra point attempt was blocked by Broncos' lineman Frank Crum, leaving the score at 19–16. Following an exchange of punts, a 54-yard field goal by Lutz tied the game at 19–19 at the 4:15 mark of the fourth quarter. The Broncos' defense forced a three-and-out, which included an 11-yard sack of Mahomes by McMillian on a 3rd-and-10.

The Broncos started their final offensive possession with 2:59 remaining in the game. Quarterback Bo Nix completed two third-down passes to wide receiver Courtland Sutton for two crucial first downs, forcing the Chiefs to use all of their team timeouts after reaching the 15-yard line. With only three seconds on the clock, Lutz kicked the game-winning 35-yard field goal as time expired, earning the team's revenge for the previous season’s meeting in Kansas City, where Lutz’s potential game-winning field goal as time expired was blocked. The Broncos extended their home win streak to 11 games and improved to 9–2, and also winning eight straight for the first time since 2012.

==== Week 13: at Washington Commanders ====
Week 13: Denver Broncos at Washington Commanders – Game summary

Quarter	1	2	3	4	OT	Total
**Broncos**	3	10	7	0	7	**27**
Commanders	0	7	7	6	6	**26**

at Northwest Stadium, Landover, Maryland

- Date: November 30
- Game time: 8:20 p.m. EST/6:20 p.m. MST
- Game weather: Clear, 40 °F (4 °C)
- Game attendance: 63,159
- Referee: Land Clark
- TV announcers (NBC): Mike Tirico, Cris Collinsworth and Melissa Stark
- Recap, Game Book

Game information

**First quarter**

- DEN – Wil Lutz 33-yard field goal, 10:28. Broncos 3–0. **Drive: 11 plays, 59 yards, 4:32.**

**Second quarter**

- DEN – Wil Lutz 33-yard field goal, 7:51. Broncos 6–0. **Drive: 13 plays, 56 yards, 6:30.**
- WAS – Chris Rodriguez Jr. 8-yard run (Jake Moody kick), 2:21. Commanders 7–6. **Drive: 11 plays, 71 yards, 5:30.**
- DEN – Courtland Sutton 11-yard pass from Bo Nix (Wil Lutz kick), 0:23. Broncos 13–7. **Drive: 10 plays, 64 yards, 1:58.**

**Third quarter**

- WAS – Treylon Burks 5-yard pass from Marcus Mariota (Jake Moody kick), 9:58. Commanders 14–13. **Drive: 10 plays, 72 yards, 5:02.**
- DEN – RJ Harvey 1-yard run (Wil Lutz kick), 3:59. Broncos 20–14. **Drive: 11 plays, 72 yards, 5:59.**

**Fourth quarter**

- WAS – Jake Moody 38-yard field goal, 12:37. Broncos 20–17. **Drive: 5 plays, 16 yards, 1:29.**
- WAS – Jake Moody 32-yard field goal, 0:00. Tied 20–20. **Drive: 18 plays, 71 yards, 3:00.**

**Overtime**

- DEN – RJ Harvey 5-yard run (Wil Lutz kick), 6:59. Broncos 27–20. **Drive: 5 plays, 76 yards, 3:01.**
- WAS – Terry McLaurin 3-yard pass from Marcus Mariota (pass failed), 2:47. Broncos 27–26. **Drive: 11 plays, 65 yards, 4:12.**

**Top passers**

- DEN – Bo Nix – 29/45, 321 yards, TD, INT
- WAS – Marcus Mariota – 28/50, 294 yards, 2 TD, INT

**Top rushers**

- DEN – RJ Harvey – 13 rushes, 35 yards, 2 TD
- WAS – Marcus Mariota – 10 rushes, 55 yards

**Top receivers**

- DEN – Evan Engram – 6 receptions, 79 yards
- WAS – Zach Ertz – 10 receptions, 106 yards

Two 33-yard field goals by placekicker Wil Lutz gave the Broncos a 6–0 lead midway through the second quarter. The latter field goal occurred after an interception of Commanders' backup quarterback Marcus Mariota, who was playing in place of the injured Jayden Daniels. Each team proceeded to alternate touchdown-scoring drives. First, the Commanders grabbed the lead, with an 8-yard run by running back Chris Rodriguez Jr. Then, Broncos' quarterback Bo Nix connected on an 11-yard pass to wide receiver Courtland Sutton. Then, Mariota threw a 5-yard pass to wide receiver Treylon Burks on the opening possession of the second half, and a 1-yard touchdown rush by running back RJ Harvey gave the Broncos a 20–14 lead later in the third quarter. On the Broncos' next possession, Nix was intercepted by linebacker Bobby Wagner early in the fourth quarter, and the Commanders capitalized, with a 38-yard field goal by placekicker Jake Moody. Each team proceeded to exchange punts, until the Commanders had the last possession with exactly three minutes left in the fourth quarter. With only four seconds left, a 32-yard field goal by Moody sent the game to overtime, tied at 20–20.

The Commanders won the overtime coin toss, but deferred to the Broncos, and the Broncos took the opening possession of overtime. Five plays in, a 5-yard touchdown run by Harvey gave the Broncos a 27–20 lead. The Commanders had a response, and on the fifth play, Mariota was intercepted by Broncos' safety Brandon Jones; however, a defensive pass interference penalty on safety Talanoa Hufanga negated the interception, giving the Commanders a new set of downs at the Broncos' 41-yard line. With 2:50 remaining in overtime, the Commanders faced a 4th-and-goal at the 3-yard line, and Mariota threw a 3-yard touchdown pass to wide receiver Terry McLaurin. However, instead of tying the game, the Commanders opted for a potential game-winning two-point conversion attempt. Mariota's pass attempt was batted away by Broncos' linebacker Nik Bonitto, allowing the Broncos to hold on for the 27–26 victory.

With another comeback win, the Broncos became the first team in NFL history to record nine consecutive comeback victories.

==== Week 14: at Las Vegas Raiders ====
Week 14: Denver Broncos at Las Vegas Raiders – Game summary

Quarter	1	2	3	4	Total
**Broncos**	7	7	7	3	**24**
Raiders	7	0	0	10	**17**

at Allegiant Stadium, Paradise, Nevada

- Date: December 7
- Game time: 2:05 p.m. MST/1:05 p.m. PST
- Game weather: None (indoor stadium)
- Game attendance: 62,442
- Referee: Shawn Smith
- TV announcers (CBS): Andrew Catalon, Charles Davis, Jason McCourty and AJ Ross
- Recap, Game Book

Game information

**First quarter**

- DEN – Bo Nix 8-yard run (Wil Lutz kick), 6:06. Broncos 7–0. **Drive: 14 plays, 81 yards, 8:54.**
- LV – Brock Bowers 15-yard pass from Geno Smith (Daniel Carlson kick), 0:00. Tied 7–7. **Drive: 10 plays, 70 yards, 6:06.**

**Second quarter**

- DEN – Marvin Mims 48-yard punt return (Wil Lutz kick), 6:29. Broncos 14–7.

**Third quarter**

- DEN – RJ Harvey 3-yard run (Wil Lutz kick), 4:05. Broncos 21–7. **Drive: 14 plays, 91 yards, 9:13.**

**Fourth quarter**

- DEN – Wil Lutz 23-yard field goal, 3:56. Broncos 24–7. **Drive: 19 plays, 90 yards, 10:17.**
- LV – Shedrick Jackson 25-yard pass from Kenny Pickett (Daniel Carlson kick), 2:17. Broncos 24–14. **Drive: 6 plays, 65 yards, 1:39.**
- LV – Daniel Carlson 46-yard field goal, 0:00. Broncos 24–17. **Drive: 6 plays, 44 yards, 0:58.**

**Top passers**

- DEN – Bo Nix – 31/38, 212 yards
- LV – Geno Smith – 13/21, 116 yards, TD

**Top rushers**

- DEN – RJ Harvey – 17 rushes, 75 yards, TD
- LV – Ashton Jeanty – 10 rushes, 30 yards

**Top receivers**

- DEN – Courtland Sutton – 6 receptions, 62 yards
- LV – Jack Bech – 6 receptions, 50 yards

Each team scored on their opening possession—an 8-yard touchdown run by Broncos' quarterback Bo Nix, followed by a 15-yard touchdown pass from Raiders' quarterback Geno Smith to tight end Brock Bowers at the end of the first quarter. The Broncos then scored 17 unanswered points. First, return specialist Marvin Mims returned a punt 48 yards for a touchdown. Then, running back RJ Harvey rushed for a 3-yard touchdown at the 4:10 mark of the third quarter. Finally, a 23-yard field goal by placekicker Wil Lutz with four minutes remaining in the fourth quarter put the game out of reach. After Smith exited the game with a shoulder injury at the end of the third quarter, backup quarterback Kenny Pickett entered the game, and threw a 25-yard touchdown pass to wide receiver Shedrick Jackson just before the two-minute warning. After a Broncos' punt, and with no timeouts, the Raiders were only able to settle for a game-ending 46-yard field goal by placekicker Daniel Carlson. The Broncos swept the Raiders in consecutive seasons for the first time since three consecutive season sweeps from 2012–2014. The Broncos secured their 10th straight win for the first time since 2012 and improved to 11–2 for the first time since 2013. With the Kansas City Chiefs losing to the Houston Texans later that night, this would ensure that the AFC West would have a new division champion for the first time since 2015.

==== Week 15: vs. Green Bay Packers ====
Week 15: Green Bay Packers at Denver Broncos – Game summary

Quarter	1	2	3	4	Total
Packers	3	13	7	3	**26**
**Broncos**	0	14	13	7	**34**

at Empower Field at Mile High, Denver, Colorado

- Date: December 14
- Game time: 2:25 p.m. MST
- Game weather: Partly cloudy, 65 °F (18 °C)
- Game attendance: 75,555
- Referee: Brad Rogers
- TV announcers (CBS): Jim Nantz, Tony Romo and Tracy Wolfson
- Recap, Game Book

Game information

**First quarter**

- GB – Brandon McManus 53-yard field goal, 7:02. Packers 3–0. **Drive: 8 plays, 17 yards, 4:38.**

**Second quarter**

- GB – Brandon McManus 26-yard field goal, 14:11. Packers 6–0. **Drive: 10 plays, 89 yards, 5:45.**
- DEN – Michael Bandy 20-yard pass from Bo Nix (Wil Lutz kick), 8:19. Broncos 7–6. **Drive: 10 plays, 70 yards, 5:52.**
- GB – Josh Jacobs 14-yard pass from Jordan Love (Brandon McManus kick), 4:29. Packers 13–7. **Drive: 9 plays, 75 yards, 3:50.**
- DEN – Lil'Jordan Humphrey 5-yard pass from Bo Nix (Wil Lutz kick), 1:56. Broncos 14–13. **Drive: 6 plays, 72 yards, 2:33.**
- GB – Brandon McManus 35-yard field goal, 0:02. Packers 16–14. **Drive: 8 plays, 70 yards, 1:54.**

**Third quarter**

- GB – Josh Jacobs 40-yard run (Brandon McManus kick), 13:59. Packers 23–14. **Drive: 3 plays, 71 yards, 1:01.**
- DEN – Courtland Sutton 14-yard pass from Bo Nix (Wil Lutz kick), 9:07. Packers 23–21. **Drive: 7 plays, 71 yards, 3:39.**
- DEN – Troy Franklin 23-yard pass from Bo Nix (run failed), 0:00. Broncos 27–23. **Drive: 11 plays, 70 yards, 4:51.**

**Fourth quarter**

- GB – Brandon McManus 37-yard field goal, 10:55. Broncos 27–26. **Drive: 9 plays, 46 yards, 4:05.**
- DEN – RJ Harvey 4-yard run (Wil Lutz kick), 7:27. Broncos 34–26. **Drive: 9 plays, 65 yards, 3:28.**

**Top passers**

- GB – Jordan Love – 24/40, 276 yards, TD, 2 INT
- DEN – Bo Nix – 23/34, 302 yards, 4 TD

**Top rushers**

- GB – Josh Jacobs – 12 rushes, 73 yards, TD
- DEN – RJ Harvey – 19 rushes, 65 yards, TD

**Top receivers**

- GB – Jayden Reed – 5 receptions, 55 yards
- DEN – Courtland Sutton – 7 receptions, 113 yards, TD

The Packers took the early lead, with two field goals by placekicker Brandon McManus, who played with the Broncos from 2014–2022. The first field goal occurred after Broncos' running back RJ Harvey lost a fumble on the game's opening possession. The Broncos got on the scoreboard midway through the second quarter, with a 20-yard touchdown pass from quarterback Bo Nix to wide receiver Michael Bandy. The Packers responded, when quarterback Jordan Love connected with running back Josh Jacobs on a 14-yard touchdown pass. The Broncos re-took the lead at the two-minute warning, with a 5-yard touchdown pass from Nix to running back Lil'Jordan Humphrey. A 35-yard field goal by McManus gave the Packers a 16–14 lead at halftime, and the Packers added to their lead on the opening possession of the second half, with a 40-yard touchdown run by Jacobs. After the Broncos went three-and-out on their first possession of the second half, the Packers were threatening to add to their lead; however, on the first play from scrimmage, Love was intercepted by Broncos' cornerback Patrick Surtain II—his first interception of the season. The Broncos capitalized, with Nix throwing a 14-yard touchdown pass to wide receiver Courtland Sutton. After forcing the Packers' first punt of the game, Nix's fourth touchdown pass—a 23-yarder to wide receiver Troy Franklin—gave the Broncos a lead at the end of the third quarter that they would not relinquish. A two-point conversion attempt was unsuccessful, leaving the score at 27–23. After a 37-yard field goal by McManus, a 4-yard touchdown run by Harvey increased the lead to 34–26. After using all of their team timeouts, the Packers had one last possession with one minute remaining in the game. However, Love threw four consecutive incomplete passes, sealing with win for Broncos, and in the process, the Broncos became the first AFC team to clinch a playoff berth.

==== Week 16: vs. Jacksonville Jaguars ====
Week 16: Jacksonville Jaguars at Denver Broncos – Game summary

Quarter	1	2	3	4	Total
**Jaguars**	7	10	14	3	**34**
Broncos	0	10	7	3	**20**

at Empower Field at Mile High, Denver, Colorado

- Date: December 21
- Game time: 2:05 p.m. MST
- Game weather: Partly cloudy, 62 °F (17 °C)
- Game attendance: 75,261
- Referee: Shawn Hochuli
- TV announcers (Fox): Kevin Kugler, Daryl Johnston and Allison Williams
- Recap, Game Book

Game information

**First quarter**

- JAX – Parker Washington 12-yard pass from Trevor Lawrence (Cam Little kick), 0:07. Jaguars 7–0. **Drive: 10 plays, 66 yards, 5:04.**

**Second quarter**

- DEN – Courtland Sutton 15-yard pass from Bo Nix (Wil Lutz kick), 12:46. Tied 7–7. **Drive: 5 plays, 65 yards, 2:21.**
- DEN – Wil Lutz 54-yard field goal, 9:10. Broncos 10–7. **Drive: 5 plays, 32 yards, 2:06.**
- JAX – Brenton Strange 3-yard pass from Trevor Lawrence (Cam Little kick), 4:33. Jaguars 14–10. **Drive: 8 plays, 59 yards, 4:37.**
- JAX – Cam Little 47-yard field goal, 0:00. Jaguars 17–10. **Drive: 9 plays, 58 yards, 1:48.**

**Third quarter**

- DEN – RJ Harvey 38-yard run (Wil Lutz kick), 13:01. Tied 17–17. **Drive: 4 plays, 73 yards, 1:59.**
- JAX – Trevor Lawrence 1-yard run (Cam Little kick), 7:44. Jaguars 24–17. **Drive: 9 plays, 75 yards, 5:17.**
- JAX – Travis Etienne 10-yard pass from Trevor Lawrence (Cam Little kick), 3:56. Jaguars 31–17. **Drive: 4 plays, 80 yards, 2:07.**

**Fourth quarter**

- JAX – Cam Little 26-yard field goal, 13:36. Jaguars 34–17. **Drive: 7 plays, 27 yards, 3:25.**
- DEN – Wil Lutz 21-yard field goal, 10:44. Jaguars 34–20. **Drive: 7 plays, 65 yards, 2:52.**

**Top passers**

- JAX – Trevor Lawrence – 23/36, 279 yards, 3 TD
- DEN – Bo Nix – 28/47, 352 yards, TD, INT

**Top rushers**

- JAX – Travis Etienne – 16 rushes, 50 yards
- DEN – RJ Harvey – 7 rushes, 50 yards, TD

**Top receivers**

- JAX – Parker Washington – 6 receptions, 145 yards, TD
- DEN – Courtland Sutton – 6 receptions, 86 yards, TD

After both teams exchanged punts to begin the game, the Broncos drove down the field; however, placekicker Wil Lutz hit the right upright on a 44-yard field goal attempt. The Jaguars took the lead at the end of the first quarter, with a 12-yard touchdown pass from quarterback Trevor Lawrence to wide receiver Parker Washington. The Broncos responded by scoring 10 unanswered points to take a 10–7 lead, with a 15-yard touchdown pass from quarterback Bo Nix to wide receiver Courtland Sutton, followed by a 54-yard field goal by Lutz. The Jaguars responded with 10 unanswered points of their own, with Lawrence connecting on a 3-yard touchdown pass to tight end Brenton Strange, followed by a 47-yard field goal by placekicker Cam Little as time expired at the end of the first half. A 38-yard touchdown run by Broncos' running back RJ Harvey on the opening possession of the second half tied the game at 17–17. However, the Jaguars reeled off 17 unanswered points and took control of the game. Lawrence rushed for a 1-yard touchdown, then connected on a 10-yard touchdown pass to running back Travis Etienne, and Little added a 26-yard field goal early in the fourth quarter. A 21-yard field goal by Lutz was as close as the Broncos would get, and Nix later threw an interception that would end any chances of a Broncos' rally, and also ending the Broncos' in-season 11-game winning streak and 12-game home win streak.

==== Week 17: at Kansas City Chiefs ====
Christmas Day games

Week 17: Denver Broncos at Kansas City Chiefs – Game summary

Quarter	1	2	3	4	Total
**Broncos**	3	3	7	7	**20**
Chiefs	0	7	3	3	**13**

at Arrowhead Stadium, Kansas City, Missouri

- Date: December 25
- Game time: 7:15 p.m. CST/6:15 p.m. MST
- Game weather: Clear, 58 °F (14 °C)
- Game attendance: 73,045
- Referee: Bill Vinovich
- TV announcers (Prime Video): Al Michaels, Kirk Herbstreit and Kaylee Hartung
- Recap, Game Book

Game information

**First quarter**

- DEN – Wil Lutz 27-yard field goal, 6:58. Broncos 3–0. **Drive: 14 plays, 56 yards, 8:02.**

**Second quarter**

- KC – Brashard Smith 5-yard pass from Chris Oladokun (Harrison Butker kick), 12:49. Chiefs 7–3. **Drive: 10 plays, 35 yards, 5:04.**
- DEN – Wil Lutz 30-yard field goal, 0:19. Chiefs 7–6. **Drive: 16 plays, 79 yards, 8:04.**

**Third quarter**

- KC – Harrison Butker 53-yard field goal, 11:42. Chiefs 10–6. **Drive: 6 plays, 28 yards, 3:18.**
- DEN – Bo Nix 9-yard run (Wil Lutz kick), 1:55. Broncos 13–10. **Drive: 14 plays, 72 yards, 9:47.**

**Fourth quarter**

- KC – Harrison Butker 47-yard field goal, 8:03. Tied 13–13. **Drive: 6 plays, 16 yards, 2:56.**
- DEN – RJ Harvey 1-yard pass from Bo Nix (Wil Lutz kick), 1:45. Broncos 20–13. **Drive: 14 plays, 65 yards, 6:18.**

**Top passers**

- DEN – Bo Nix – 26/38, 182 yards, TD, INT
- KC – Chris Oladokun – 13/22, 66 yards, TD

**Top rushers**

- DEN – RJ Harvey – 14 rushes, 43 yards
- KC – Kareem Hunt – 7 rushes, 38 yards

**Top receivers**

- DEN – Courtland Sutton – 4 receptions, 40 yards
- KC – Travis Kelce – 5 receptions, 36 yards

Though the Broncos entered the game as double-digit favorites and faced the Chiefs’ third-string quarterback, Chris Oladokun, they struggled to put away Kansas City. Oladokun was placing in place of regular starter Patrick Mahomes and backup quarterback Gardner Minshew, both of whom suffered season-ending knee injuries during the Chiefs' two previous games. The Broncos began by driving down the field, and reached the red zone, but failed to reach the end zone, and were forced to settle on a 27-yard field goal by placekicker Wil Lutz midway through the first quarter. Following an interception by Broncos' quarterback Bo Nix, the Chiefs scored a touchdown on the following possession, with Oladokun connecting on a 5-yard touchdown pass to running back Brashard Smith. Following an exchange of punts, a 30-yard field goal by Lutz gave pulled the Broncos to within a 7–6 deficit at halftime. After a 53-yard field goal by Chiefs' placekicker Harrison Butker on the opening possession of the second half, the Broncos took a 13–10 lead late in the third quarter, with Nix scrambling for a 9-yard touchdown. A 47-yard field goal by Butker tied the game at 13–13 with eight minutes remaining. The game-deciding play occurred late in the fourth quarter, when the Broncos faced a 4th-and-2 inside the Chiefs' 10-yard line, but did not intend to snap the ball. Chiefs' defensive tackle Chris Jones jumped off-sides, giving the Broncos a fresh set of downs, which led to the go-ahead and eventual game-winning 1-yard touchdown pass from Nix to running back RJ Harvey. The Chiefs' had one last possession, but with 20 seconds remaining and facing a 4th-and-8 at the Broncos' 26-yard line, Oladokun overthrew wide receiver Marquise Brown in the end zone.

With the win, the Broncos snapped a nine-game road losing streak at Arrowhead Stadium and recorded their first season sweep of the Chiefs since 2014. Following the Los Angeles Chargers’ loss to the Houston Texans two days later, the Broncos clinched the AFC West—their first division title since their 2015 Super Bowl-winning season.

==== Week 18: vs. Los Angeles Chargers ====
Week 18: Los Angeles Chargers at Denver Broncos – Game summary

Quarter	1	2	3	4	Total
Chargers	0	3	0	0	**3**
**Broncos**	10	0	3	6	**19**

at Empower Field at Mile High, Denver, Colorado

- Date: January 4
- Game time: 2:25 p.m. MST
- Game weather: Sunny, 69 °F (21 °C)
- Game attendance: 74,801
- Referee: Clete Blakeman
- TV announcers (CBS): Jim Nantz, Tony Romo and Tracy Wolfson
- Recap, Game Book

Game information

**First quarter**

- DEN – Wil Lutz 24-yard field goal, 5:06. Broncos 3–0. **Drive: 15 plays, 81 yards, 8:52.**
- DEN – Ja'Quan McMillian 45-yard interception return (Wil Lutz kick), 3:39. Broncos 10–0.

**Second quarter**

- LAC – Cameron Dicker 30-yard field goal, 0:03. Broncos 10–3. **Drive: 12 plays, 51 yards, 2:53.**

**Third quarter**

- DEN – Wil Lutz 26-yard field goal, 10:07. Broncos 13–3. **Drive: 7 plays, 52 yards, 3:04.**

**Fourth quarter**

- DEN – Wil Lutz 41-yard field goal, 11:45. Broncos 16–3. **Drive: 4 plays, -2 yards, 1:36.**
- DEN – Wil Lutz 23-yard field goal, 2:23. Broncos 19–3. **Drive: 10 plays, 52 yards, 5:34.**

**Top passers**

- LAC – Trey Lance – 20/44, 136 yards, INT
- DEN – Bo Nix – 14/23, 141 yards

**Top rushers**

- LAC – Trey Lance – 9 rushes, 69 yards
- DEN – Bo Nix – 8 rushes, 49 yards

**Top receivers**

- LAC – Keenan Allen – 7 receptions, 36 yards
- DEN – Evan Engram – 3 receptions, 45 yards

The Chargers rested several key starters, including quarterback Justin Herbert, giving Denver an advantage. The Broncos' defense only allowed one scoring play—a 30-yard field goal by placekicker Cameron Dicker. However, the Broncos failed to score an offensive touchdown, settling for four field goals by placekicker Wil Lutz. The game's only touchdown occurred in the first quarter, when cornerback Ja'Quan McMillian returned an interception off Chargers' backup quarterback Trey Lance 45 yards for a touchdown. With the win, the Broncos clinched the No. 1 seed in the AFC and a first-round bye for the first time since 2015. With a 14–3 record, they also tied a franchise record for wins in a single season, previously set in 1998. They were set to host the No. 6 seed Buffalo Bills on January 17, 2026 in the Divisional Round of the playoffs.

=== Standings ===
==== Division ====
AFC West
	W	L	T	PCT	DIV	CONF	PF	PA	STK
^{(1)} Denver Broncos	14	3	0	.824	5–1	9–3	401	311	W2
^{(7)} Los Angeles Chargers	11	6	0	.647	5–1	8–4	368	340	L2
Kansas City Chiefs	6	11	0	.353	1–5	3–9	362	328	L6
Las Vegas Raiders	3	14	0	.176	1–5	3–9	241	432	W1

==== Conference ====
AFC
Seed	Team	Division	W	L	T	PCT	DIV	CONF	SOS	SOV	STK
**Division leaders**
1 (Note: Denver finished ahead of New England based on common games (Denver 6–0 to New England 5–1 against: Cincinnati, Las Vegas, NY Giants, NY Jets and Tennessee).)	Denver Broncos	West	14	3	0	.824	5–1	9–3	.422	.378	W2
2	New England Patriots	East	14	3	0	.824	5–1	9–3	.391	.370	W3
3	Jacksonville Jaguars	South	13	4	0	.765	5–1	10–2	.478	.425	W8
4	Pittsburgh Steelers	North	10	7	0	.588	4–2	8–4	.503	.453	W1
**Wild cards**
5 (Note: Houston finished ahead of Buffalo based on head-to-head victory.)	Houston Texans	South	12	5	0	.706	5–1	10–2	.522	.441	W9
6	Buffalo Bills	East	12	5	0	.706	4–2	9–3	.471	.412	W1
7	Los Angeles Chargers	West	11	6	0	.647	5–1	8–4	.469	.425	L2
**Did not qualify for the postseason**
8 (Note: Indianapolis finished ahead of Baltimore based on conference record (Indianapolis 6–6 to Baltimore 5–7).)	Indianapolis Colts	South	8	9	0	.471	2–4	6–6	.540	.382	L7
9	Baltimore Ravens	North	8	9	0	.471	3–3	5–7	.507	.408	L1
10	Miami Dolphins	East	7	10	0	.412	3–3	3–9	.488	.378	L1
11 (Note: Cincinnati finished ahead of Kansas City based on conference record (Cincinnati 5–7 to Kansas City 3–9).)	Cincinnati Bengals	North	6	11	0	.353	3–3	5–7	.521	.451	L1
12	Kansas City Chiefs	West	6	11	0	.353	1–5	3–9	.514	.363	L6
13	Cleveland Browns	North	5	12	0	.294	2–4	4–8	.486	.418	W2
14 (Note: Las Vegas finished ahead of NY Jets and Tennessee based on conference record (Las Vegas 3–9 to NY Jets 2–10 and Tennessee 2–10).)	Las Vegas Raiders	West	3	14	0	.176	1–5	3–9	.538	.451	W1
15 (Note: NY Jets finished ahead of Tennessee based on strength of victory (NY Jets .373 to Tennessee .275).)	New York Jets	East	3	14	0	.176	0–6	2–10	.552	.373	L5
16	Tennessee Titans	South	3	14	0	.176	0–6	2–10	.574	.275	L2
**Tiebreakers** (Note: When breaking ties for three or more teams under the NFL's rules, they are first broken within divisions, then comparing only the highest ranked remaining team from each division.)

=== Statistics ===
==== Team leaders ====
Category	Player(s)	Value
Passing yards	Bo Nix	3,931
Passing touchdowns	Bo Nix	25
Rushing yards	J. K. Dobbins	772
Rushing touchdowns	RJ Harvey	7
Receptions	Courtland Sutton	74
Receiving yards	Courtland Sutton	1,017
Receiving touchdowns	Courtland Sutton	7
Points	Wil Lutz	123
Kickoff return yards	Marvin Mims	658
Punt return yards	Marvin Mims	452
Tackles	Alex Singleton	135
Sacks	Nik Bonitto	14
Forced fumbles	Nik Bonitto; Ja'Quan McMillian	2
Interceptions	Ja'Quan McMillian; Dondrea Tillman	2

Source for this section: Denver Broncos' official website.

==== League rankings ====
Offense
Category	Value	NFL rank (out of 32)
Total yards	342.6 YPG	10th
Yards per play	5.3	T–15th
Rushing yards	118.7 YPG	16th
Yards per rush	4.4	T–13th
Passing yards	223.9 YPG	11th
Yards per pass	6.4	T–27th
Pass completions	388/613 (.633)	20th
Total touchdowns	45	T–14th
Rushing touchdowns	18	T–11th
Receiving touchdowns	25	T–16th
Scoring	23.6 PPG	14th
Red Zone Touchdowns	33/57 (.579)	13th
Third down efficiency	96/233 (.412)	T–10th
Fourth down efficiency	10/20 (.500)	T–22nd
First downs per game	19.6	T–14th
Fewest sacks allowed	23	T–1st
Fewest giveaways	17	T–11th
Fewest penalties	124	28th
Least penalty yardage	1,149	32nd

Defense
Category	Value	NFL rank (out of 32)
Total yards	278.2 YPG	2nd
Yards per play	4.5	1st
Rushing yards	91.1 YPG	2nd
Yards per rush	3.9	T–2nd
Passing yards	187.2 YPG	7th
Yards per pass	6.1	2nd
Pass completions	343/593 (.578)	2nd
Total touchdowns	29	1st
Rushing touchdowns	11	T–4th
Receiving touchdowns	18	T–4th
Scoring	18.3 PPG	3rd
Red Zone Touchdowns	20/47 (.426)	1st
Third down efficiency	80/237 (.338)	2nd
Fourth down efficiency	14/27 (.519)	11th
First downs per game	17.6	T–6th
Sacks	68 *	1st
Takeaways	14	T–26th
Fewest penalties	118	26th
Least penalty yardage	843	15th

Special teams
Category	Value	NFL rank (out of 32)
Gross punting	47.6 YPP	T–14th
Net punting	41.1 YPP	19th
Kickoffs	62.0 YPK	4th
Punt returns	14.1 YPR	4th
Kick returns	25.3 YPR	21st
Punt coverage	10.6 YPR	T–18th
Kick coverage	27.6 YPR	26th

*	Indicates franchise record

Source for this section: Pro-Football Reference.

=== Starters ===
Position	Player	Age	Years pro	Starts
Offense
QB	Bo Nix	25	1	17
RB	J. K. Dobbins	27	5	9
RB	RJ Harvey	24	Rookie	7
WR	Courtland Sutton	30	7	16
WR	Troy Franklin	22	1	7
TE	Adam Trautman	28	5	12
LT	Garett Bolles	33	8	17
LG	Alex Palczewski	26	1	10
C	Luke Wattenberg	28	3	15
RG	Quinn Meinerz	27	4	17
RT	Mike McGlinchey	31	7	17
Defense
LDE	Zach Allen	28	6	17
DT	D. J. Jones	30	8	14
RDE	John Franklin-Myers	29	7	15
LOLB	Jonathon Cooper	27	4	17
LILB	Alex Singleton	32	6	16
RILB	Justin Strnad	29	4	8
ROLB	Nik Bonitto	26	3	16
LCB	Patrick Surtain II	25	4	14
SS	Talanoa Hufanga	26	4	17
FS	Brandon Jones	27	5	13
RCB	Riley Moss	25	2	17

Source for this section: Pro-Football Reference.

=== Captains ===
Position	Player	Times captain
Offense
QB	Bo Nix	2
WR	Courtland Sutton	5
G	Quinn Meinerz	2
Defense
DT	D. J. Jones	1
ILB	Alex Singleton	3
CB	Patrick Surtain II	2
S	Talanoa Hufanga	1
Special Teams
K	Wil Lutz	2

Source for this section: Denver Broncos.

== Postseason ==
=== Schedule ===
Round	Date	Opponent (seed)	Result	Record	Venue	Sources
Wild Card	First-round bye					
Divisional	January 17	Buffalo Bills (6)	W 33–30 (OT)	1–0	Empower Field at Mile High	Recap
AFC Championship	January 25	New England Patriots (2)	L 7–10	1–1	Empower Field at Mile High	Recap

=== Game summaries ===
==== AFC Divisional Playoffs: vs. (6) Buffalo Bills ====
AFC Divisional Playoffs: (6) Buffalo Bills at (1) Denver Broncos – Game summary

Quarter	1	2	3	4	OT	Total
Bills	7	3	7	13	0	30
Broncos	3	17	3	7	3	33

at Empower Field at Mile High, Denver, Colorado

- Date: January 17, 2026
- Game time: 2:35 p.m. MST
- Game weather: Sunny, 36 °F (2 °C)
- Game attendance: 77,043
- Referee: Carl Cheffers
- TV announcers (CBS): Jim Nantz, Tony Romo and Tracy Wolfson
- Recap, Game Book

Game information

First quarter

- DEN – Wil Lutz 28-yard field goal, 7:29. Broncos 3–0. Drive: 14 plays, 64 yards, 7:31.
- BUF – Mecole Hardman 4-yard pass from Josh Allen (Matt Prater kick), 0:05. Bills 7–3. Drive: 12 plays, 67 yards, 7:24.

Second quarter

- DEN – Frank Crum 7-yard pass from Bo Nix (Wil Lutz kick), 9:33. Broncos 10–7. Drive: 8 plays, 69 yards, 3:47.
- BUF – Matt Prater 33-yard field goal, 2:13. Tied 10–10. Drive: 13 plays, 69 yards, 7:20.
- DEN – Lil'Jordan Humphrey 29-yard pass from Bo Nix (Wil Lutz kick), 0:22. Broncos 17–10. Drive: 11 plays, 70 yards, 1:51.
- DEN – Wil Lutz 50-yard field goal, 0:00. Broncos 20–10. Drive: 1 play, 0 yards, 0:02.

Third quarter

- DEN – Wil Lutz 33-yard field goal, 11:35. Broncos 23–10. Drive: 4 plays, 2 yards, 2:33.
- BUF – Keon Coleman 10-yard pass from Josh Allen (Matt Prater kick), 6:49. Broncos 23–17. Drive: 9 plays, 73 yards, 4:46.

Fourth quarter

- BUF – Dalton Kincaid 14-yard pass from Josh Allen (Matt Prater kick), 13:24. Bills 24–23. Drive: 9 plays, 85 yards, 4:06.
- BUF – Matt Prater 31-yard field goal, 4:11. Bills 27–23. Drive: 13 plays, 68 yards, 7:39.
- DEN – Marvin Mims 26-yard pass from Bo Nix (Wil Lutz kick), 0:55. Broncos 30–27. Drive: 8 plays, 73 yards, 3:16.
- BUF – Matt Prater 50-yard field goal, 0:05. Tied 30–30. Drive: 8 plays, 41 yards, 0:50.

Overtime

- DEN – Wil Lutz 24-yard field goal, 4:44. Broncos 33–30. Drive: 6 plays, 75 yards, 3:02.

Top passers

- BUF – Josh Allen – 25/39, 283 yards, 3 TD, 2 INT
- DEN – Bo Nix – 26/46, 279 yards, 3 TD, INT

Top rushers

- BUF – James Cook – 24 rushes, 117 yards
- DEN – Bo Nix – 12 rushes, 29 yards

Top receivers

- BUF – Dalton Kincaid – 6 receptions, 83 yards, TD
- DEN – Marvin Mims – 8 receptions, 93 yards, TD

The Broncos played their first playoff game in Denver since 2016 and took an early lead over Buffalo thanks to a Wil Lutz field goal. However, the Bills took the lead when Josh Allen found Mecole Hardman, giving them the lead after a Broncos third and out. Linebacker Alex Singleton forced running back James Cook to fumble the ball, the Broncos took advantage and the lead on their next possession when Bo Nix found offensive lineman Frank Crum for the touchdown, which was Crum's first in the NFL. Buffalo kicked a field goal to tie the game, but Nix found Lil'Jordan Humphrey to give Denver a seven-point lead, which the Broncos extended to 10 following a force fumble by Nik Bonitto that saw them kick a field goal before the half. Coming out of the half, Bonitto stripped the ball from Allen and that set up a 33-yard field goal for Lutz to give Denver a 13 point lead. However, Buffalo responded and scored a touchdown on their next possession. After both teams exchanged interceptions, the Bills took the lead when Allen found tight end Dalton Kincaid for another touchdown and after a third and out by the Broncos, the Bills drove down the field but were held to a field goal. The Broncos responded and took a 30–27 lead on a Marvin Mims touchdown with less than a minute in regulation, but Buffalo drove down the field and tied the game at 30 with five seconds left, forcing the game to overtime. After the Broncos punted on their first possession, Allen threw an interception to cornerback Ja'Quan McMillian on the Bills' first and only possession of the overtime period. The Broncos drove down the field, and thanks to two defensive pass interference penalties, kicked the game winning field goal, giving them their first playoff win since Super Bowl 50. After the game, it was announced that Nix had suffered a season-ending broken ankle and would undergo surgery.

This game reached an average of approximately 39.6 million viewers, with a peak of approximately 51.3 million viewers during overtime. It became the most-watched Saturday sports telecast since the 1994 Winter Olympics, and also became the most-watched Saturday afternoon telecast in American television history.

==== AFC Championship: vs. (2) New England Patriots ====
AFC Championship: (2) New England Patriots at (1) Denver Broncos – Game summary

Quarter	1	2	3	4	Total
Patriots	0	7	3	0	10
Broncos	7	0	0	0	7

at Empower Field at Mile High, Denver, Colorado

- Date: January 25, 2026
- Game time: 1:05 p.m. MST
- Game weather: Cloudy, 26 °F (−3 °C)
- Game attendance: 76,862
- Referee: Alex Kemp
- TV announcers (CBS): Jim Nantz, Tony Romo, Tracy Wolfson and Evan Washburn
- Recap, Game Book

Game information

First quarter

- DEN – Courtland Sutton 6-yard pass from Jarrett Stidham (Wil Lutz kick), 10:19. Broncos 7–0. Drive: 5 plays, 59 yards, 1:41.

Second quarter

- NE – Drake Maye 6-yard run (Andres Borregales kick), 2:10. Tied 7–7. Drive: 2 plays, 12 yards, 0:42.

Third quarter

- NE – Andres Borregales 23-yard field goal, 5:29. Patriots 10–7. Drive: 16 plays, 64 yards, 9:31.

Fourth quarter

- No scoring plays

Top passers

- NE – Drake Maye – 10/21, 86 yards
- DEN – Jarrett Stidham – 17/31, 133 yards, TD, INT

Top rushers

- NE – Rhamondre Stevenson – 25 rushes, 71 yards
- DEN – RJ Harvey – 13 rushes, 37 yards

Top receivers

- NE – Mack Hollins – 2 receptions, 51 yards
- DEN – Marvin Mims – 4 receptions, 62 yards

After both teams traded punts to begin the game, a 53-yard completion by backup quarterback Jarrett Stidham, filling in for the injured Bo Nix, to Marvin Mims set up a 6-yard touchdown reception to Courtland Sutton for the Broncos' only points of the game. In the second quarter, on consecutive possessions, Stidham threw an incompletion on 4 and 1 and then was stripped sacked, which led to the Patriots scoring the game-tying touchdown. At the start of the second half, New England took the lead, 10–7, on a successful field goal from Andrés Borregales, which proved to be the last score of the game. After the Broncos went 3 and out, the Patriots drove down the field but Borregales's next attempt went wide right. After both teams exchanged punts twice, the Broncos had the ball at New England 33-yard line but only gained five yards on three plays and kicker Wil Lutz had his field goal attempt blocked, keeping the score at 10–7. After forcing the Patriots' eighth punt, the Broncos had one last chance to tie the game or win it. However Stidham threw an interception with only 2:18 left, sealing their fate and ending their impressive season with their first home playoff loss to New England in team history (first overall since 2011).

== Awards and honors ==
=== NFL Top 100 ===
Rank	Player	Position	Change
10	Patrick Surtain II	CB	▲42
38	Nik Bonitto	LB	NR
64	Bo Nix	QB	NR
90	Zach Allen	DE	NR

=== Weekly ===
Week	Award(s)	Recipient	Source
1	NFLPA Community MVP	T Garett Bolles	
4	NFLPA Community MVP	WR Trent Sherfield	
5	AFC Defensive Player of the Week	LB Nik Bonitto	
6	AFC Defensive Player of the Week	LB Jonathon Cooper	
8	NFL Rookie of the Week	RB RJ Harvey	
11	AFC Special Teams Player of the Week	K Wil Lutz	
14	AFC Special Teams Player of the Week	WR/RS Marvin Mims	
15	FedEx Air & Ground Player of the Week	QB Bo Nix	

=== Monthly ===
Month	Award(s)	Recipient	Source
October	AFC Special Teams Player of the Month	K Wil Lutz	

=== Yearly ===
Award(s)	Recipient	Source
Hispanic Pro Football Player of the Year	LB Nik Bonitto	

=== Pro Bowl and All-Pro selections ===
Wide receiver Courtland Sutton, offensive tackle Garett Bolles, guard Quinn Meinerz, defensive lineman Zach Allen, linebacker Nik Bonitto, and cornerback Patrick Surtain II were selected to the Pro Bowl. Bolles, Meinerz, Allen, as well as special teamer Devon Key were first team All-Pro selections, while Surtain and safety Talanoa Hufanga made the second team.

=== PWFA All-Rookie Team ===
Punter Jeremy Crawshaw was named to the PFWA All-Rookie Team.
