= Jaden Robinson =

American football player (born 2000)

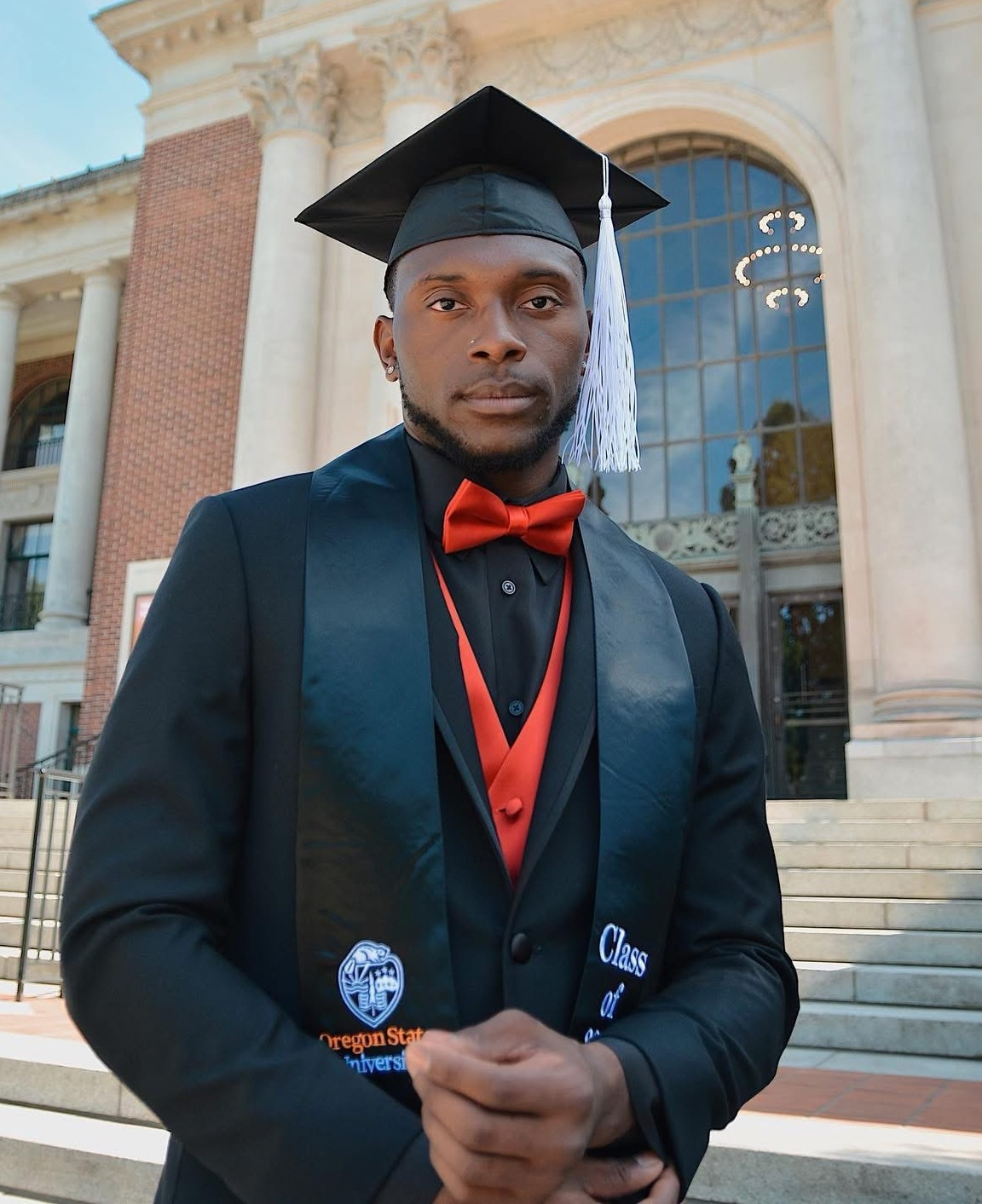
- Robinson in 2023

No. 33 – New York Giants
- Position: Cornerback
- Roster status: Practice squad

Personal information
- Born: November 14, 2000 (age 26); Oakland, California, U.S.
- Listed height: 6 ft 0 in (1.83 m)
- Listed weight: 193 lb (88 kg)

Career information
- High school: Auburn Riverside (Auburn, Washington)
- College: Oregon State (2018–2024)
- NFL draft: 2025: undrafted

Career history
- Denver Broncos (2025–2026)*; New York Giants (2026–present)*
- * Offseason or practice squad member only
- Stats at Pro Football Reference

Jaden Robinson (born November 14, 2000) is an American professional football cornerback for the New York Giants of the National Football League (NFL). He played college football for the Oregon State Beavers and was signed by the Denver Broncos as an undrafted free agent in 2025.

== Early life ==
Robinson was born on November 14, 2000, in Oakland, California. He attended Auburn Riverside High School in Washington state as a teenager, participating in football, basketball, and track. As a senior in 2017, Robinson recorded 35 tackles, two tackles-for-loss, six interceptions, and four pass deflections at cornerback while also making 22 receptions for 640 yards and eight touchdowns as a wide receiver. He was an all-league selection at both positions that year, as well as second-team all-state. This led to him being named the Seattle Times Male Athlete of the Year. Robinson was named a three-star recruit out of high school at cornerback. He committed to play football for Oregon State, explaining that his choice was due to the coaching staff and welcoming atmosphere.

== College career ==
Robinson saw minimal action early in his college career due to a recurring shoulder injury, playing in just eleven games and logging five tackles from 2018 to 2021. As a redshirt junior in 2022, Robinson's role was increased, with him recording 13 tackles and a sack and playing in 12 games, starting one of them. During his two redshirt senior years, Robinson became Oregon State's primary coverage defensive back. In 2023, Robinson again played in 12 games, this time posting 33 tackles, half a sack, a forced fumble, and eight pass deflections. In 2024, Robinson totaled a career-high 38 tackles, two tackles-for-loss, a fumble recovery, and three pass deflections over the course of eight games.

== Professional career ==
Pre-draft measurables
Height	Weight	Arm length	Hand span	Wingspan	40-yard dash	10-yard split	20-yard split	20-yard shuttle	Three-cone drill	Vertical jump	Broad jump	Bench press
5 ft 11 5/8 in (1.82 m)	192 lb (87 kg)	31 1/2 in (0.80 m)	9 in (0.23 m)	6 ft 4 1/2 in (1.94 m)	4.42 s	1.59 s	2.59 s	4.18 s	6.71 s	38.0 in (0.97 m)	10 ft 4 in (3.15 m)	14 reps
All values from Pro Day

=== Denver Broncos ===
After going unselected in the 2025 NFL draft, Robinson signed with the Denver Broncos as an undrafted free agent on May 9, 2025. Participating in the Broncos' offseason training camp, Robinson competed with fellow rookies Jahdae Barron, Kendall Bohler, and Joshua Pickett, along with Damarri Mathis, Quinton Newsome, and Reese Taylor. During the preseason, he recorded three total tackles. On August 26, Robinson was waived by the Broncos as a part of final roster cuts and was re-signed to their practice squad a day later.

Robinson signed a reserve/futures contract with Denver on January 30, 2026. On August 7, Robinson was waived by the Broncos with an injury designation.

=== New York Giants ===
On September 16, 2026, Robinson signed with the New York Giants' practice squad. The move reunited him with his former defensive backs coach Addison Lynch.

== Personal life ==
Robinson's mother, musician Kashann Brown known as Ms. Kash, was estranged from his father and he was raised by Brown and his stepfather, Brandon McCoy. In his youth, Robinson idolized Los Angeles Lakers shooting guard Kobe Bryant. In his adolescence, Robinson struggled with delinquency and poverty, with his mother eventually having the family temporarily reside in a homeless shelter. Robinson has two siblings, Jordan Rodgers and his younger sister, Shahira Cooper Robinson. He and Cooper Robinson share the same father, Charles Robinson III, who has been estranged from both siblings since their childhood.
