= Joe Michalski =

American football player (born 2001)

Profile
- Position: Center

Personal information
- Born: April 6, 2001 (age 25); Kansas City, Kansas, U.S.
- Listed height: 6 ft 5 in (1.96 m)
- Listed weight: 305 lb (138 kg)

Career information
- High school: Saint Thomas Aquinas (Overland Park, Kansas)
- College: Oklahoma State (2019–2024)
- NFL draft: 2025: undrafted

Career history
- Denver Broncos (2025)*; New England Patriots (2026)*
- * Offseason or practice squad member only
- Stats at Pro Football Reference

Joseph Michalski (/məˈhɔːlskiː/ muh-HALL-skee; born April 6, 2001) is an American professional football center. He played college football for the Oklahoma State Cowboys and was signed by the Denver Broncos as an undrafted free agent in 2025.

== Early life ==
Michalski was born on April 6, 2001, in Kansas City, Kansas. He attended Saint Thomas Aquinas High School in Overland Park, Kansas, where he played football, baseball, and track and field. He was named all-state as a senior. Rated as a three-star recruit by 247sports, he committed to play football for Oklahoma State over offers from Cornell, Dartmouth, North Dakota, Texas State, Wyoming, Yale, Iowa, Kansas, and Kansas State.

== College career ==
Michalski redshirted his true freshman year in 2019. As a redshirt freshman, he played in 7 games, mainly on special teams blocking for kicks. In 2021 he, Michalski played in all 14 games and earned 4 starts in the last 4 games of the season. He played in 12 of 13 games in his junior season. He started 5 games, including the last 4 games of the season.

In his senior year in 2023, Michalski started all 14 games, joining teammate Ollie Gordon II as the only two players to do so for the Cowboys. He was voted as a team captain and emerged as the leading offensive lineman for Oklahoma State. Prior to the team's appearance in the 2023 Texas Bowl against Texas A&M, he announced that he would return for his super-senior year in 2024. This then led to all of Oklahoma State's offensive line that was eligible to return to do so.

In 2024, he was again voted a team captain and was again the star lineman for Oklahoma state. Furthermore, he was added to the Rimington Trophy watchlist and the Lombardi Award watchlist. He was named honorable mention All-Big 12 and finished his career with 35 starts and 59 total games played.

== Professional career ==
Pre-draft measurables
Height	Weight	Arm length	Hand span	40-yard dash	10-yard split	20-yard split	20-yard shuttle	Three-cone drill	Vertical jump	Broad jump	Bench press
6 ft 3 1/2 in (1.92 m)	297 lb (135 kg)	32 1/4 in (0.82 m)	9 3/4 in (0.25 m)	5.27 s	1.77 s	3.03 s	4.47 s	7.47 s	29 in (0.74 m)	8 ft 11 in (2.72 m)	28 reps
All values from Big 12 Pro Day

=== Denver Broncos ===
On April 27, 2025, Michalski signed a three-year, $2.97 million contract with the Denver Broncos as one of 15 initial undrafted free agent signings. On August 26, he was waived by the Broncos and then re-signed to the practice squad two days later on August 28. On January 7, 2026, Michalski was waived.

=== New England Patriots ===
On August 15, 2026, Michalski signed with the New England Patriots. He was waived by the Patriots as a part of final roster cuts on August 30.

== Personal life ==
During his six years in college, Michalski was academic All-Big 12 for the last five.
