= Marques Cox =

American football player (born 1999)

Orlando Storm
- Position: Offensive tackle
- Roster status: Unsigned draft pick

Personal information
- Born: December 28, 1999 (age 26); Peoria, Illinois, U.S.
- Listed height: 6 ft 5 in (1.96 m)
- Listed weight: 315 lb (143 kg)

Career information
- High school: Peoria
- College: Northern Illinois (2018–2022); Kentucky (2023–2024)
- NFL draft: 2025: undrafted

Career history
- Denver Broncos (2025)*; Arizona Cardinals (2025)*; Denver Broncos (2026)*; Miami Dolphins (2026)*; Orlando Storm (2027-present)
- * Offseason or practice squad member only
- Stats at Pro Football Reference

Marques Cox (/ˈmɑːrkəs/ MAR-kuss; born December 28, 1999) is an American professional football offensive tackle. He played college football for the Northern Illinois Huskies and the Kentucky Wildcats. Cox was signed by the Denver Broncos as an undrafted free agent in 2025. He has also been a member of the Arizona Cardinals and Miami Dolphins.

== Early life ==
Cox was born on December 28, 1999, in Peoria, Illinois to Gregory and Ruthie Cox. Playing on both the offensive and defensive lines at Peoria High School, Cox started on an offense that scored a record 805 points, while also totaling 73 tackles, 13 sacks, an interception, and a blocked field goal. He subsequently earned All-State honors. Cox also participated in wrestling tournaments in high school.

== College career ==
=== Northern Illinois ===
Cox redshirted during his first year at Northern Illinois, not participating in any games. In 2019, he played in all 12 games at left tackle and on special teams, starting in 10. In a COVID-shortened 2020 season, Cox started in all six games. In 2021, the NIU offensive line that Cox started 14 games on gave up a total of just 10 sacks in 14 games, the second-least in the country that year. Ahead of the 2022 season, Cox had started in 29 consecutive games at left tackle. He started in four games before suffering a season-ending injury in a game against Kentucky.

=== Kentucky ===
Prior to the 2023 season, Cox transferred to Kentucky, reuniting with former high school teammate Courtland Ford. In 2023, he started in all 13 games. As a senior in 2024, Cox starting in all 12 games and led the team in pancake blocks.

== Professional career ==
Pre-draft measurables
| Height | Weight |
|---|---|
| 6 ft 4 3/4 in (1.95 m) | 318 lb (144 kg) |
Values from Pro Day

=== Denver Broncos ===
After going unselected in the 2025 NFL draft, Cox signed with the Denver Broncos as an undrafted free agent on April 27, 2025. He was waived by Denver on August 27 as a part of final preseason roster cuts. On October 21, Cox was re-signed to the team's practice squad. On November 11, he was waived from the practice squad, but was later re-signed on November 24. On December 9, Cox was released from the practice squad.

=== Arizona Cardinals ===
On December 16, 2025, Cox was signed to the Arizona Cardinals' practice squad. On January 12, 2026, following the end of the Cardinals' season, Cox's practice squad contract expired and he became a free agent.

=== Denver Broncos (second stint) ===
On January 29, 2026, Cox signed a reserve/futures contract with the Broncos. On May 8, he was waived by the Broncos.

=== Miami Dolphins ===
On May 21, 2026, Cox signed with the Miami Dolphins. He was waived by the Dolphins on August 31.

== Personal life ==
Cox has two brothers, Maurice and Martez.
