= Kyrese Rowan =

American football player (born 2001)

Profile
- Position: Wide receiver

Personal information
- Born: January 25, 2001 (age 25); Ogden, Utah, U.S.
- Listed height: 5 ft 10 in (1.78 m)
- Listed weight: 185 lb (84 kg)

Career information
- High school: Roy (Roy, Utah)
- College: Utah (2019–2021); Utah State (2022–2024)
- NFL draft: 2025: undrafted

Career history
- Denver Broncos (2025)*; Hamilton Tiger-Cats (2026)*; Denver Broncos (2026)*; New Orleans Saints (2026)*
- * Offseason or practice squad member only
- Stats at Pro Football Reference

Kyrese Rowan (born January 25, 2001), formerly Kyrese White, is an American professional football wide receiver. He played college football for the Utah Utes and Utah State Aggies. Rowan was signed by the Denver Broncos as an undrafted free agent in 2025.

== Early life ==
Rowan was born in Ogden, Utah. From the age of six, he was raised by his stepfather, Emmett White, whose last name he wore on his jersey during his junior and senior year of college. While attending Roy High School, Rowan was a three sport athlete, participating in football, basketball, and track.

== College career ==
=== Utah ===
Rowan initially wanted to play at Utah State, his stepfather's alma mater. However, a torn meniscus suffered while playing basketball and coaching staff turnover ultimately led to him not receiving an offer.

Rowan instead began his college career at Utah as a walk-on special teamer in the fall of 2019. As a freshman, his was active for a single game, the 2019 Alamo Bowl. In 2020, he played in four games. In 2021, he became a larger presence on special teams, playing in 13 games and recording four tackles.

=== Utah State ===
Ahead of the 2022 season, Rowan transferred to Utah State. Making his debut at wide receiver during his first season at Utah State, Rowan played in seven games, making one reception for two yards. In 2023, he caught two receptions for six yards, in addition to three tackles on special teams. In 2024, he logged 44 receptions for 526 yards and three touchdowns as well as 188 yards as a kick returner. He played sparingly until his senior season, where he recorded 526 receiving yards and 188 kick return yards.

== Professional career ==
=== Denver Broncos (first stint) ===
After going unselected in the 2025 NFL draft, Rowan received an invite to the Denver Broncos' rookie minicamp.

After impressing during minicamp, Rowan was signed by the Broncos as an undrafted free agent on May 12. Rowan was waived by the Broncos during final roster cuts on August 25. He was later signed to the Broncos' practice squad on October 22.

On December 2, he was released from the practice squad to make room for Elijah Moore. He was re-signed to the practice squad on December 9.

=== Hamilton Tiger-Cats ===
After his practice squad contract expired at the end of the Broncos' season, Rowan signed with the Hamilton Tiger-Cats of the Canadian Football League (CFL) on April 29, 2026. On May 10, he was placed on the league suspension list, but was activated 10 days later. On May 31, following the conclusion of training camp, Rowan was released by the Tiger-Cats.

=== Denver Broncos (second stint) ===
On August 7, 2026, Rowan was again signed by the Denver Broncos following an injury to Marvin Mims. On August 30, Rowan was waived by the Broncos as a part of final roster cuts.

=== New Orleans Saints ===
On September 9, 2026, Rowan was signed to the New Orleans Saints' practice squad. On October 27, he was released.

== Personal life ==
Rowan's stepfather, Emmett White, is a former college football running back who also played for Utah State from 1998 to 2001, as is third all-time for them in career all-purpose yards. His brother, Chris, played college baseball as a catcher for Utah and Coastal Carolina.
