= Gregory Junior =

American football player (born 1999)

Profile
- Position: Defensive Back

Personal information
- Born: June 21, 1999 (age 27); Crossett, Arkansas, U.S.
- Listed height: 6 ft 0 in (1.83 m)
- Listed weight: 203 lb (92 kg)

Career information
- High school: Crossett
- College: Ouachita Baptist (2017–2021)
- NFL draft: 2022: 6th round, 197th overall pick

Career history
- Jacksonville Jaguars (2022–2023); Indianapolis Colts (2024)*; Houston Texans (2024)*; Green Bay Packers (2025)*; Denver Broncos (2025)*; Hamilton Tiger-Cats (2026)
- * Offseason or practice squad member only

Awards and highlights
- First-team All-GAC (2021)

Career NFL statistics
- Total tackles: 17
- Pass deflections: 1
- Stats at Pro Football Reference

Gregory Junior II (born June 21, 1999) is an American professional football cornerback. He played college football for the Ouachita Baptist Tigers and was selected by the Jacksonville Jaguars in the sixth round of the 2022 NFL draft.

== College career ==
Junior played college football at Ouachita Baptist. During his senior season in 2021, he recorded 46 tackles, 3 tackles for loss, and seven pass breakups.

== Professional career ==
Pre-draft measurables
Height	Weight	Arm length	Hand span	Wingspan	40-yard dash	10-yard split	20-yard split	20-yard shuttle	Three-cone drill	Vertical jump	Broad jump	Bench press
5 ft 11 1/4 in (1.81 m)	202 lb (92 kg)	30 7/8 in (0.78 m)	8 3/4 in (0.22 m)	6 ft 4 1/4 in (1.94 m)	4.46 s	1.63 s	2.60 s	4.17 s	6.97 s	39.5 in (1.00 m)	10 ft 3 in (3.12 m)	18 reps
All values from Pro Day:

=== Jacksonville Jaguars ===
Junior was selected in the sixth round of the 2022 NFL draft by the Jacksonville Jaguars, becoming the first player to be drafted to the NFL from Ouachita Baptist. He was waived on August 30, 2022 and signed to the practice squad the next day. He was promoted to the active roster on December 19.

On September 16, 2023, Junior was placed on injured reserve after suffering a hamstring injury in Week 1. He was activated on November 11.

On August 6, 2024, the Jaguars waived Junior with an injury designation.

=== Indianapolis Colts ===
On September 17, 2024, Junior signed with the Indianapolis Colts practice squad. He was released by Indianapolis on October 7.

=== Houston Texans ===
On October 14, 2024, Junior was signed to the Houston Texans practice squad. He signed a reserve/future contract with Houston on January 21, 2025. On May 13, Junior was waived by the Texans.

=== Green Bay Packers ===
On May 21, 2025, Junior signed with the Green Bay Packers. He was released by Green Bay on August 4.

=== Denver Broncos ===
On August 10, 2025, Junior was signed by the Denver Broncos. He was waived five days later with an injury designation.

=== Hamilton Tiger-Cats ===
Deen signed with the Hamilton Tiger-Cats of the Canadian Football League (CFL) on January 30, 2026. He was released on July 3.
