= Tanner McCalister =

American football player (born 2000)

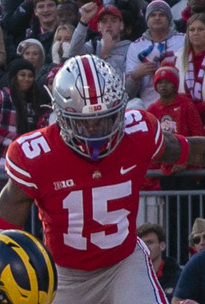
- McCalister with the Ohio State Buckeyes in 2022

Profile
- Position: Safety

Personal information
- Born: January 27, 2000 (age 26); Dallas, Texas, U.S.
- Listed height: 5 ft 11 in (1.80 m)
- Listed weight: 191 lb (87 kg)

Career information
- High school: Rockwall-Heath (Heath, Texas)
- College: Oklahoma State (2018–2021); Ohio State (2022)
- NFL draft: 2023: undrafted

Career history
- Cleveland Browns (2023); Denver Broncos (2024); New York Jets (2025)*; Kansas City Chiefs (2025)*; Denver Broncos (2025)*; Kansas City Chiefs (2026)*
- * Offseason or practice squad member only

Career NFL statistics as of 2024
- Tackles: 3
- Stats at Pro Football Reference

Tanner McCalister (born January 27, 2000) is an American professional football safety. He played college football for the Oklahoma State Cowboys and Ohio State Buckeyes. He has previous played for the Cleveland Browns and Denver Broncos.

== Early life ==
McCalister grew up in Rockwall, Texas, and attended Rockwall-Heath High School. He originally committed to play college football at Arkansas, but later signed to play with the Oklahoma State Cowboys.

== College career ==
McCalister started his college career at Oklahoma State where he played for four years. He was named to the Big 12 Conference all-academic three times at Oklahoma State. In his four years for the Cowboys he posted 123 tackles, 4.5 going for a loss, an interception, and 12 pass deflections. In his best year he put up 42 tackles, 1 going for a loss, one interception, and 6 pass deflections. After he graduated from Oklahoma State he transferred to Ohio State. In his one season with the Buckeyes he recorded 24 tackles, 3 interceptions, and a pass deflection.

== Professional career ==
Pre-draft measurables
Height	Weight	Arm length	Hand span	Wingspan	40-yard dash	10-yard split	20-yard split	20-yard shuttle	Three-cone drill	Vertical jump	Broad jump	Bench press
5 ft 10 1/2 in (1.79 m)	191 lb (87 kg)	30 1/4 in (0.77 m)	9 1/4 in (0.23 m)	6 ft 1 5/8 in (1.87 m)	4.44 s	1.60 s	2.59 s	4.18 s	6.90 s	37.0 in (0.94 m)	10 ft 3 in (3.12 m)	22 reps
All values from Pro Day

=== Cleveland Browns ===
After not being selected in the 2023 NFL draft, McCalister signed with the Cleveland Browns as an undrafted free agent. He was waived on August 29, 2023, and re-signed to the practice squad. During the 2023 season, McCalister was active in three games, recording two tackles. He was not signed to a reserve/future contract by the team after the season and thus became a free agent upon the expiration of his practice squad contract.

=== Denver Broncos (first stint) ===
On January 22, 2024, McCalister signed a reserve/future contract with the Denver Broncos. On August 27, the Broncos waived him during their final roster cuts. The next day, he was signed to the Broncos' practice squad. On October 12, McCalister was promoted to the active roster. On October 15, he was waived by the Broncos. The next day, he was signed back to the practice squad. In total, McCalister played in three games for the Broncos, registering a single tackle.

McCalister signed a reserve/future contract with Broncos on January 13, 2025, but was later waived on June 18.

=== New York Jets ===
On July 24, 2025, McCalister was signed by the New York Jets. He was waived by the Jets on August 24.

=== Kansas City Chiefs (first stint) ===
On December 16, 2025, McCalister was signed to the Kansas City Chiefs' practice squad. He was released on January 5, 2026, following the conclusion of the Chiefs' 2025 season.

=== Denver Broncos (second stint) ===
On January 6, 2026, McCalister was signed to the Denver Broncos' practice squad.

=== Kansas City Chiefs (second stint) ===
On February 4, 2026, McCalister signed a reserve/futures contract with the Kansas City Chiefs. On August 30, he was waived by the Chiefs as a part of final roster cuts; he was re-signed to the team's practice squad the next day. McCalister was released by the Chiefs on September 15.

== Personal life ==
McCalister has a degree in finance and enjoys traveling.
