= Jordan Miller (defensive lineman, born 2000) =

American football player (born 2000)

No. 90 – Denver Broncos
- Position: Nose tackle
- Roster status: Practice squad

Personal information
- Born: January 20, 2000 (age 26)
- Listed height: 6 ft 3 in (1.91 m)
- Listed weight: 307 lb (139 kg)

Career information
- High school: Sandalwood (Jacksonville, Florida)
- College: Miami (2018–2022); SMU (2023)
- NFL draft: 2024: undrafted

Career history
- Denver Broncos (2024–2025)*; Miami Dolphins (2026)*; Denver Broncos (2026–present)*
- * Offseason or practice squad member only
- Stats at Pro Football Reference

Jordan Miller (born January 20, 2000) is an American professional football nose tackle for the Denver Broncos of the National Football League (NFL). He played college football for the Miami Hurricanes and SMU Mustangs and was signed by the Denver Broncos as an undrafted free agent in 2024.

== College career ==
Miller began his college football career in 2018 at the University of Miami as a redshirt freshman, playing in one game. Over the next four seasons, Miller would play in 47 games.

Miller then enrolled at Southern Methodist University as a graduate student. During the 2023 season, he started in all 14 games, recording 26 tackles, four tackles-for-loss, and half a sack. He was subsequently selected to the 2023 East–West Shrine Bowl.

== Professional career ==
Pre-draft measurables
Height	Weight	Arm length	Hand span	Wingspan	40-yard dash	10-yard split	20-yard split	20-yard shuttle	Three-cone drill	Vertical jump	Broad jump	Bench press
6 ft 2 3/8 in (1.89 m)	304 lb (138 kg)	33 3/8 in (0.85 m)	9 7/8 in (0.25 m)	6 ft 8 5/8 in (2.05 m)	5.18 s	1.82 s	2.93 s	5.01 s	7.82 s	28.0 in (0.71 m)	9 ft 0 in (2.74 m)	27 reps
All values from Pro Day

=== Denver Broncos (first stint) ===
After going undrafted in the 2024 NFL draft, Miller was signed by the Denver Broncos on May 10, 2024. On August 27, he was waived during final roster cuts. The next day, Miller was re-signed to the practice squad. He signed a reserve/future contract with Denver on January 13, 2025.

On August 26, 2025, Miller was waived by the Broncos and re-signed to the practice squad the following day. On January 26, 2026, he signed a futures contract with the Broncos again. On August 30, Miller was waived by the Broncos as a part of final roster cuts.

=== Miami Dolphins ===
On September 1, 2026, Miller signed to the Miami Dolphins practice squad. On September 28, he was released.

=== Denver Broncos (second stint) ===
On November 3, 2026, Miller signed with the Denver Broncos practice squad.
