= Reese Taylor =

American football player (born 1999)

Profile
- Positions: Cornerback, special teamer

Personal information
- Born: August 27, 1999 (age 27); Indianapolis, Indiana, U.S.
- Listed height: 5 ft 9 in (1.75 m)
- Listed weight: 188 lb (85 kg)

Career information
- High school: Ben Davis (Indianapolis)
- College: Indiana (2018–2021); Purdue (2022)
- NFL draft: 2023: undrafted

Career history
- Kansas City Chiefs (2023)*; Denver Broncos (2023–2025); Miami Dolphins (2026)
- * Offseason or practice squad member only

Career NFL statistics
- Tackles: 4
- Stats at Pro Football Reference

Reese Taylor (born August 27, 1999) is an American professional football cornerback and special teamer. He played college football for the Indiana Hoosiers and Purdue Boilermakers and was signed by the Kansas City Chiefs as an undrafted free agent in 2023. Taylor has also played for the Denver Broncos and Miami Dolphins.

== Early life ==
Taylor was born in Indianapolis, Indiana. He played quarterback at Ben Davis High School, being selected as an All-State quarterback twice and leading the team to a state title his senior year. This earned him the 2017 Indiana Mr. Football Award.

== College career ==
=== Indiana ===
Taylor signed with the Indiana Hoosiers in 2018, where he played in all 12 games of the season as a reserve player, totaling 7 tackles, 174 receiving yards, and 83 rushing yards. Prior to the 2019 season, he made the move to cornerback. He recorded 13 tackles, one interception, one tackle-for-loss, and two pass breakups across 11 games and one start. In 2020, he led Indiana in pass breakups with seven, as well as recording 29 tackles, one interception, four tackles-for-loss, and one sack. He also began to return punts, accruing 73 punt return yards. In 2021, he recorded 25 tackles, three tackles-for-loss, one sack, two pass breakups, and 32 punt return yards across nine games and five starts.

=== Purdue ===
In 2022, Taylor transferred to Purdue as a fifth-year senior. He started all 13 games of the season, recording a career-high 34 tackles in addition to one interception and four pass breakups.

== Professional career ==
Pre-draft measurables
Height	Weight	Arm length	Hand span	Wingspan	40-yard dash	10-yard split	20-yard split	20-yard shuttle	Three-cone drill	Vertical jump	Broad jump	Bench press
5 ft 9 1/2 in (1.77 m)	188 lb (85 kg)	30 3/8 in (0.77 m)	10 in (0.25 m)	6 ft 3 1/4 in (1.91 m)	4.46 s	1.60 s	2.60 s	4.07 s	6.63 s	38.5 in (0.98 m)	10 ft 5 in (3.18 m)	12 reps
All values from Pro Day

=== Kansas City Chiefs ===
After going unselected in the 2023 NFL draft, Taylor was signed by the Kansas City Chiefs as an undrafted free agent. He played 65 snaps across all three of the Chiefs' preseason games, recording six tackles and a quarterback hit. He was waived during the final roster cuts, but was signed to the Chiefs' practice squad the day after. The next day, he was released by the Chiefs.

=== Denver Broncos ===
On November 8, 2023, Taylor was signed to the Denver Broncos' practice squad. He signed a reserve/futures contract with Denver on January 8, 2024. On August 27, Taylor was waived by the Broncos. The next day, he was re-signed to the practice squad. He signed another reserve/future contract on January 13, 2025.

On August 26, 2025, Taylor was waived by the Broncos. The next day, he was re-signed to the practice squad. On November 15, Taylor was promoted to the active roster for the first time in his career.

On August 30, 2026, Taylor was waived by the Broncos during final roster cuts.

=== Miami Dolphins ===
On August 31, 2026, Taylor was claimed off of waivers by the Miami Dolphins. On November 10, he was waived by the Dolphins.
