= 2024 Denver Broncos season =

American football team season

- Owner: Rob Walton (Note: Other members of the ownership group include Carrie Walton Penner, Greg Penner, Mellody Hobson, Condoleezza Rice, and Lewis Hamilton)
- General manager: George Paton
- Head coach: Sean Payton
- Offensive coordinator: Joe Lombardi
- Defensive coordinator: Vance Joseph
- Home stadium: Empower Field at Mile High

Results
- Record: 10–7
- Division place: 3rd AFC West
- Playoffs: Lost Wild Card Playoffs (at Bills) 7–31
- All-Pros: 5: RG Quinn Meinerz (1st team); PR Marvin Mims (1st team); CB Patrick Surtain II (1st team); DE Zach Allen (2nd team); OLB Nik Bonitto (2nd team)
- Pro Bowlers: OLB Nik Bonitto; RS Marvin Mims; CB Patrick Surtain II

Uniform
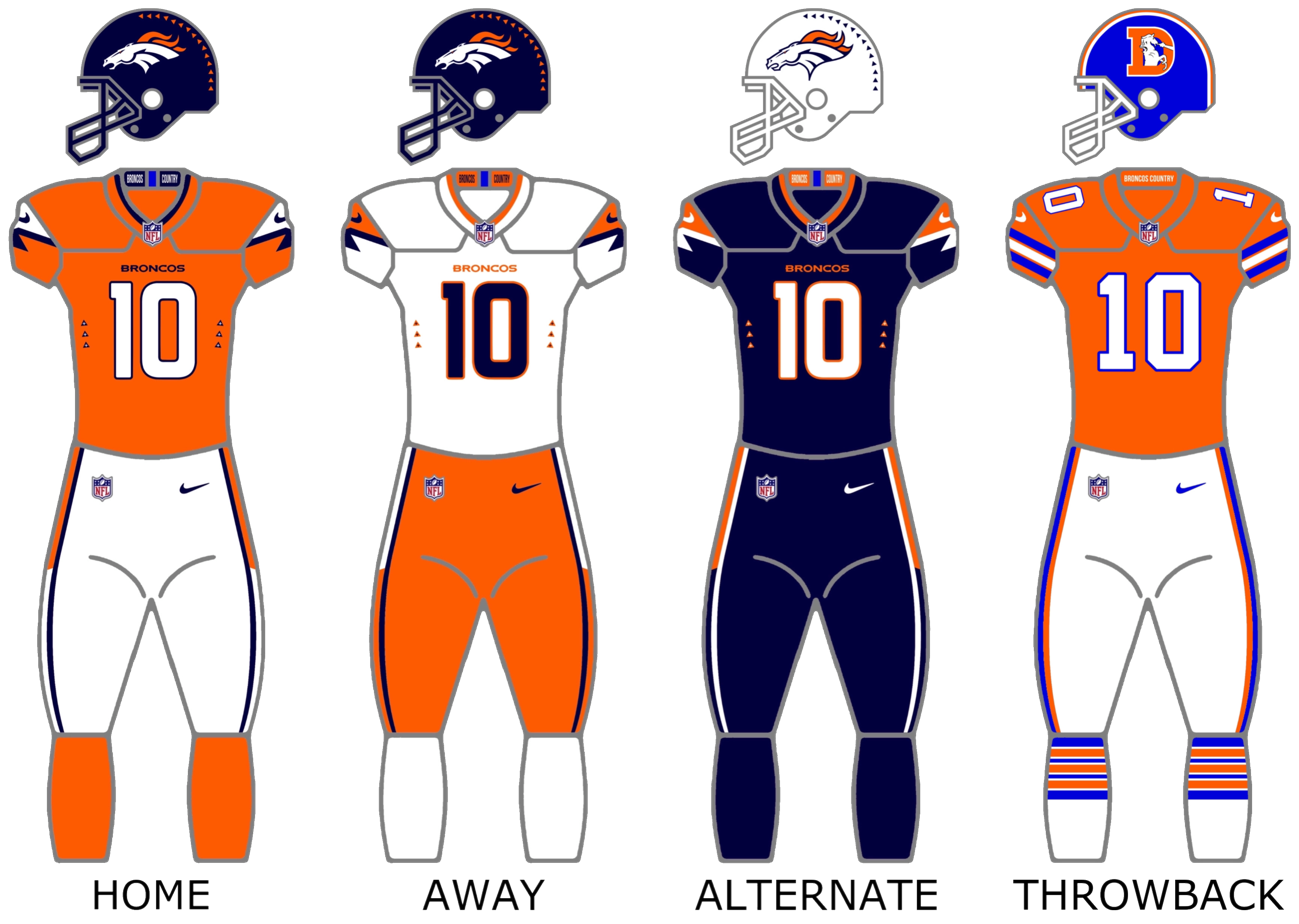

The 2024 season was the Denver Broncos' 55th in the National Football League (NFL) and their 65th overall. It was also their fourth under the leadership of general manager George Paton, their third under the ownership of the Walton-Penner family group and their second under head coach Sean Payton. This was the team's first season since their Super Bowl 50-winning 2015 season without Justin Simmons, as he left to go to the Atlanta Falcons.

During the offseason, Russell Wilson, the team's starting quarterback during the previous two seasons, was released, and the Broncos selected Bo Nix as the team's first-round draft pick to succeed Wilson. With Nix behind center, the Broncos improved on their win total from 2023, with a 10–7 record—the team's first winning season since 2016 and their first playoff berth since their 2015 Super Bowl-winning season. It also marked the first time since 2015 in which the Broncos had multiple winning streaks of three or more games. Despite the long-awaited playoff appearance, the Broncos would be eliminated following a 31–7 loss to the Buffalo Bills in the Wild Card.

== Coaching changes ==
=== Offseason ===
2024 Denver Broncos coaching staff changes
Position	Previous coach	Replacement	Source(s)
Defensive line coach	Marcus Dixon, 2022–2023	Jamar Cain	
Defensive backs coach	Christian Parker, 2021–2023	Jim Leonhard	
Senior offensive assistant	None	Pete Carmichael Jr.	

=== In-season ===
On November 12, assistant head coach Mike Westhoff stepped down for health reasons.

== Roster changes ==
=== Future contracts ===
All players listed below were signed to reserve/future contracts. Each player was officially added to the active roster on March 13—the first day of the 2024 league year.

Position	Player	Notes
RB	Tyler Badie	waived August 27, assigned to the practice squad on August 28, promoted to the active roster on September 25
QB	Ben DiNucci	waived May 8
WR	Phillip Dorsett	released May 10, re-signed May 13, released August 26
DE	Jordan Jackson	made the Week 1 roster
OT	Demontrey Jacobs	waived August 27
S	Devon Key	made the Week 1 roster
NT	Rashard Lawrence	released May 10
S	Tanner McCalister	waived August 27, assigned to the practice squad on August 28, promoted to the active roster on October 12, waived October 15, assigned to the practice squad on October 17
LB	Durell Nchami	designated as waived/injured on August 27
OLB	Ronnie Perkins	designated as waived/injured on August 6, released on September 17
OT	Will Sherman	waived August 27, assigned to the practice squad on August 28, released October 9, assigned to the practice squad on January 6
WR	David Sills	released August 27, assigned to the practice squad on August 28
S	Keidron Smith	waived November 12, assigned to the practice squad on November 14
CB	Reese Taylor	waived August 27, assigned to the practice squad on August 28

=== Free agents ===
Position	Player	Tag	2024 team	Notes
WR	Michael Bandy	ERFA	Denver Broncos	re-signed March 6, waived August 27, assigned to the practice squad on August 28
FB	Michael Burton	UFA	Denver Broncos	re-signed March 13, released August 27, assigned to the practice squad on August 28, promoted to the active roster on September 11, released November 1, assigned to the practice squad on November 2 promoted to the active roster on November 13
C	Lloyd Cushenberry	UFA	Tennessee Titans	signed with the Titans on March 13
OT	Cameron Fleming	UFA	Denver Broncos	signed to the practice squad on October 8
LB	Jonas Griffith	RFA	None	re-signed February 14, released August 27
DE	Jonathan Harris	UFA	Miami Dolphins	originally an RFA, signed with the Dolphins on March 15
WR	Lil'Jordan Humphrey	UFA	Denver Broncos	re-signed March 14, released August 27, assigned to the practice squad on August 28, promoted to the active roster on September 21
ILB	Josey Jewell	UFA	Carolina Panthers	signed with the Panthers on March 13
S	P. J. Locke	UFA	Denver Broncos	re-signed March 11
K	Wil Lutz	UFA	Denver Broncos	re-signed March 12
CB	Fabian Moreau	UFA	Minnesota Vikings	signed with the Vikings on July 30
ILB	Ben Niemann	UFA	Detroit Lions	signed with the Lions on June 10
NT	Mike Purcell	UFA	New England Patriots	signed with the Patriots on August 1
ILB	Justin Strnad	UFA	Denver Broncos	re-signed March 21
TE	Adam Trautman	UFA	Denver Broncos	re-signed March 13
RB	Dwayne Washington	UFA	None	
CB	K'Waun Williams	UFA	None	
Unrestricted Free Agent (UFA): Players with four or more accrued seasons whose contracts expired at the end of the previous season Restricted Free Agent (RFA): Players with three accrued seasons whose contracts expired at the end of the previous season Exclusive-Rights Free Agent (ERFA): Players with two or fewer accrued seasons whose contracts expired at the end of the previous season

=== Signings ===
Position	Player	2023 team(s)	Notes
RB	Salvon Ahmed	Miami Dolphins	signed to the practice squad on October 1, released October 8
ILB	Kwon Alexander	Pittsburgh Steelers	signed to the practice squad on September 25
ILB	Cody Barton	Washington Commanders	signed March 18
DE	Angelo Blackson	Jacksonville Jaguars	signed April 15, released August 26
ILB	K. J. Cloyd	None	signed to the practice squad on December 10
ILB	Zach Cunningham	Philadelphia Eagles	signed to the practice squad on September 25, promoted to the active roster on November 27
WR	Kaden Davis	Arizona Cardinals	signed to the practice squad on September 11, released October 1, assigned to the practice squad on October 8, released October 14
C	Dieter Eiselen	Houston Texans	signed to the practice squad on October 8, released October 19
OLB	Andrew Farmer	Los Angeles Chargers	signed to the practice squad on September 17
P	Trenton Gill	Chicago Bears	signed May 15, waived August 26
CB	Kaleb Hayes	Jacksonville Jaguars; New York Giants	claimed off waivers from the Giants on August 12, waived August 26
S	Brandon Jones	Miami Dolphins	signed March 14
TE	Hunter Kampmoyer	Los Angeles Chargers	signed August 2, waived August 27
C	Sam Mustipher	Baltimore Ravens	signed April 4, released August 27
TE	Donald Parham	Los Angeles Chargers	signed to the practice squad on August 28
WR	A. T. Perry	New Orleans Saints	signed to the practice squad on October 8
OT	Matt Peart	New York Giants	signed March 20
WR	Josh Reynolds	Detroit Lions	signed March 28, waived December 3
DT	Malcolm Roach	New Orleans Saints	signed March 14
ILB	Andre Smith	Atlanta Falcons	signed June 13, released August 26
G	Calvin Throckmorton	Carolina Panthers; Tennessee Titans	signed April 1, released August 27, assigned to the practice squad on August 28, promoted to the active roster on November 1, waived November 26, assigned to the practice squad on November 27
OLB	Dondrea Tillman	Birmingham Stallions (UFL)	signed June 20, waived August 27, assigned to the practice squad on August 28, promoted to the active roster on September 18
CB	Levi Wallace	Pittsburgh Steelers	signed April 22, waived December 24
ILB	Kristian Welch	Green Bay Packers	signed August 29, released October 15

=== Departures ===
Position	Player	Notes
TE	Greg Dulcich	waived November 25
DE	Elijah Garcia	waived August 27
G	Nick Gargiulo	waived August 27, assigned to the practice squad on August 28
CB	Art Green	waived August 26
DE	Matt Henningsen	waived August 27, assigned to the practice squad on August 28
LB	Thomas Incoom	waived August 27
WR	Brandon Johnson	waived August 27
TE	Chris Manhertz	released March 7
WR	Tim Patrick	released August 27
RB	Samaje Perine	released August 27
S	Justin Simmons	released March 7
S	Caden Sterns	released August 5
WR	Jalen Virgil	waived August 27
QB	Russell Wilson	contract terminated on March 4, released March 13

=== Draft ===
2024 Denver Broncos draft selections
Round	Selection	Player	Position	College	Notes
1	12	Bo Nix	QB	Oregon	
2	45	Traded to the New Orleans Saints (Note: The Broncos traded a second-round selection (45th overall) and a 2023 first-round selection to the New Orleans Saints in exchange for a third-round selection (81st overall) and the coaching rights to head coach Sean Payton.)			
3	76	Jonah Elliss	DE	Utah	
3	81	Traded to the Seattle Seahawks (Note: The Broncos traded a third-round selection (81st overall) and a 2023 fourth-round selection to the Seattle Seahawks in exchange for a 2023 third-round selection.)			From Saints
4	102	Troy Franklin	WR	Oregon	From Seahawks (Note: The Broncos traded fourth-, fifth- and sixth-round selections (121st, 136th and 207th overall) to the Seattle Seahawks in exchange for fourth- and seventh-round selections (102nd and 235th overall).)
4	113	Traded to the New York Jets (Note: The Broncos traded a fourth-round selection (113th overall) to the New York Jets in exchange for a fifth-round selection (145th overall) and DE Jacob Martin.)			
4	121	Traded to the Seattle Seahawks			From Dolphins (Note: The Broncos traded a 2025 fifth-round selection and DE Bradley Chubb to the Miami Dolphins in exchange for a fourth-round selection (121st overall), a 2023 first-round selection (29th overall) and RB Chase Edmonds.)
5	136	Traded to the Seattle Seahawks			From Browns (Note: The Broncos traded WR Jerry Jeudy to the Cleveland Browns in exchange for fifth- and sixth-round selections (136th and 203rd overall).)
5	145	Kris Abrams-Draine	CB	Missouri	From Jets
5	147	Audric Estimé	RB	Notre Dame	
6	189	Traded to the Los Angeles Rams (Note: The Broncos traded a sixth-round selection (189th overall) to the Los Angeles Rams in exchange for a seventh-round selection (239th overall) and LB Kenny Young.)			
6	203	Traded to the New York Jets (Note: The Broncos traded a sixth-round selection (203rd overall) to the New York Jets in exchange for a seventh-round selection (256th overall) and QB Zach Wilson.)			From Browns
6	207	Traded to the Seattle Seahawks			From 49ers (Note: The Broncos traded a seventh-round selection and LB Randy Gregory to the San Francisco 49ers in exchange for a sixth-round selection (207th overall).)
7	232	Traded to the San Francisco 49ers			
7	235	Devaughn Vele	WR	Utah	From Seahawks
7	239	Traded to the New Orleans Saints (Note: The Broncos traded a seventh-round selection (239th overall) to the New Orleans Saints in exchange for K Wil Lutz.)			From Rams
7	256	Nick Gargiulo	C	South Carolina	From Jets

Draft trades

=== Undrafted free agents ===
All undrafted free agents were signed on May 10, unless otherwise noted.

2024 Denver Broncos undrafted free agents
Player	Position	College	Notes
Cam Allen	S	Purdue	waived May 15
Jaylon Allen	ILB	Memphis	designated as waived/injured on August 14
Levelle Bailey	ILB	Fresno State	waived August 29, assigned to the practice squad on August 30, promoted to the active roster on October 8
Omar Brown	S	Nebraska	waived August 26
Nik Constantinou	P	Texas A&M	waived May 13
Frank Crum	OT	Wyoming	made the Week 1 roster
Oliver Jervis	G	Colorado State	signed August 1, waived August 26
Dylan Leonard	TE	Georgia Tech	waived June 13
Brandon Matterson	DE	UTSA	waived August 2
Jordan Miller	NT	SMU	waived August 27, assigned to the practice squad on August 28
Alec Mock	ILB	Air Force	waived June 20, signed August 6, waived August 12, signed August 14, waived August 26
Quinton Newsome	CB	Nebraska	signed May 13, waived August 27, assigned to the practice squad on August 28, released October 8, signed to the practice squad on October 14
Lincoln Victor	WR	Washington State	waived May 13
Blake Watson	RB	Memphis	made the Week 1 roster, waived October 17, signed to the practice squad on October 19, promoted to the active roster on December 24
Thomas Yassmin	TE	Utah	signed as part of the International Player Pathway Program, waived August 27, assigned to the practice squad on August 28

=== Reinstatements ===
On August 5, defensive end Eyioma Uwazurike was reinstated by the NFL, after serving a one-year suspension for violating the league's gambling policy.

=== Trades ===
Trade partner	Broncos give	Broncos receive	Source
Arizona Cardinals	LB Baron Browning	2025 sixth-round selection	
New York Jets	2026 sixth-round selection	DE John Franklin-Myers	

=== Injuries ===
Position	Player	Time & type of injury	Games missed	Source(s)
DE	Zach Allen	heel, November 22 practice	Week 12	
RB	Tyler Badie	back, Week 4	injured reserve, Weeks 5–18	
OT	Quinn Bailey	ankle, training camp	injured reserve, missed the entire 2024 season	
OLB	Baron Browning	foot, Week 2	injured reserve, Weeks 3–6	
OT	Frank Crum	illness, January 1 practice	NF-Inj. list, Week 18–Wild Card weekend	
RB	Audric Estimé	ankle, Week 1	injured reserve, Weeks 2–5	
S	Brandon Jones	abdomen, Week 10	Week 11	
S	P. J. Locke	thumb, October 23 practice	Weeks 8–9	
CB	Damarri Mathis	high ankle sprain, preseason	injured reserve, Weeks 1–6	
OT	Mike McGlinchey	MCL sprain, Week 2	injured reserve, Weeks 3–6	
RB	Jaleel McLaughlin	quadriceps, Week 15	Week 16	
CB	Riley Moss	MCL sprain, Week 12	Weeks 13–16	
OT	Alex Palczewski	high ankle sprain, Week 5	Weeks 6–8	
OLB	Ronnie Perkins	undisclosed, training camp	injured reserve, Weeks 1–2	
WR	Josh Reynolds	finger, Week 5	injured reserve, Weeks 6–13	
ILB	Drew Sanders	ruptured Achilles tendon, offseason workouts	PUP list, Weeks 1–12	
ILB	Alex Singleton	ruptured ACL, Week 3	season-ending injured reserve, starting with Week 4	
S	JL Skinner	ankle, Week 2	Weeks 3–4	
CB	Patrick Surtain II	concussion, Week 6	Week 7	
S	Delarrin Turner-Yell	ruptured ACL, MCL and meniscus, Week 17 of the 2023 season	PUP list, missed the entire 2024 season	
WR	Devaughn Vele	ribs, Week 1	Weeks 2–5	
C	Luke Wattenberg	ankle, Week 5	injured reserve, Weeks 6–9	

=== Practice squad elevations ===
2024 Denver Broncos standard elevations
Position	Name	Week(s)	Source(s)
LB	Kwon Alexander	7, 8, 9	
RB	Tyler Badie	2, 3	
LB	Levelle Bailey	4, 5	
FB	Michael Burton	1, 9, 10	
LB	Zach Cunningham	10, 11, 12	
T	Cameron Fleming	6	
G	Nick Gargiulo	12, 13, 15, Wild Card	
DE	Matt Henningsen	16, 17, 18	
WR	Lil'Jordan Humphrey	1, 2	
S	Tanner McCalister	3, 4	
WR	David Sills	17	
S	Keidron Smith	11	
CB	Reese Taylor	15	
G	Calvin Throckmorton	6, 7, 8	
RB	Blake Watson	16	

== Uniform changes ==
On April 22, the Broncos unveiled a new set of uniforms known as The "Mile High Collection"—the team's first uniform change since 1997. The team also unveiled their 1977 throwback jerseys which includes the royal blue "D" helmets.

== Staff ==
2024 Denver Broncos staff
Front office: President – Damani Leech; General manager – George Paton; Assistant general manager – Darren Mougey; Vice president of player personnel – Cody Rager; Director of player personnel – Reed Burckhardt; Director of pro personnel – A. J. Durso; Executive director of football operations – Kelly Kleine; Vice president of football administration – Rich Hurtado; Vice president of football operation and compliance – Mark Thewes; Vice president of player development – Ray Jackson; Director of college scouting – Brian Stark; Senior personnel executive – Roman Phifer; Senior personnel executive – David Shaw; Assistant director of college scouting – Nick Schiralli; Head coaches: Head coach – Sean Payton; Assistant to the head coach – Paul Kelly; Offensive coaches: Offensive coordinator – Joe Lombardi; Pass game coordinator – John Morton; Quarterbacks – Davis Webb; Running backs – Lou Ayeni; Wide receivers – Keary Colbert; Tight ends – Declan Doyle; Offensive line – Zach Strief; Assistant offensive line – Austin King; Senior offensive assistant – Pete Carmichael; Passing game specialist – Zack Grossi; Offensive quality control – Logan Kilgore; Offensive quality control – Favian Upshaw	Defensive coaches: Defensive coordinator – Vance Joseph; Defensive line – Jamar Cain; Outside linebackers – Michael Wilhoite; Inside linebackers – Greg Manusky; Defensive pass game coordinator/defensive backs – Jim Leonhard; Senior defensive assistant – Joe Vitt; Defense quality control – Addison Lynch; Defense quality control – Isaac Shewmaker; Special teams coaches: Special teams coordinator – Ben Kotwica; Assistant special teams – Chris Banjo; Strength and conditioning: Vice president of player health and performance – Beau Lowery; Head strength and conditioning – Dan Dalrymple; Assistant strength and conditioning – Korey Jones; Assistant strength and conditioning – Shaun Snee

== Final roster ==
2024 Denver Broncos roster
Quarterbacks (QB): 10 Bo Nix; 8 Jarrett Stidham; 4 Zach Wilson; Running backs (RB): 28 Tyler Badie; 20 Michael Burton; 23 Audric Estimé; 38 Jaleel McLaughlin; 25 Blake Watson; 33 Javonte Williams; Wide receivers (WR): 16 Troy Franklin; 84 Lil'Jordan Humphrey; 19 Marvin Mims; 14 Courtland Sutton; 17 Devaughn Vele; Tight ends (TE): 45 Nate Adkins; 85 Lucas Krull; 82 Adam Trautman	Offensive linemen (OL): 72 Garett Bolles T; 54 Alex Forsyth C; 69 Mike McGlinchey T; 77 Quinn Meinerz G; 63 Alex Palczewski T; 79 Matt Peart T; 74 Ben Powers G; 60 Luke Wattenberg C; Defensive linemen (DL): 99 Zach Allen DE; 98 John Franklin-Myers DE; 94 Jordan Jackson DE; 93 D. J. Jones NT; 97 Malcolm Roach DE/NT; 96 Eyioma Uwazurike DE	Linebackers (LB): 56 Levelle Bailey ILB; 55 Cody Barton ILB; 15 Nik Bonitto OLB; 0 Jonathon Cooper OLB; 42 Zach Cunningham ILB; 52 Jonah Elliss OLB; 41 Drew Sanders ILB; 40 Justin Strnad ILB; 92 Dondrea Tillman OLB; Defensive backs (DB): 31 Kris Abrams-Draine CB; 22 Brandon Jones FS; 26 Devon Key FS/SS; 6 P. J. Locke SS; 27 Damarri Mathis CB; 29 Ja'Quan McMillian CB; 21 Riley Moss CB; 34 JL Skinner SS; 1 Tremon Smith CB; 2 Patrick Surtain II CB; Special teams (ST): 9 Riley Dixon P; 48 Mitchell Fraboni LS; 3 Wil Lutz K	Practice squad: 83 Michael Bandy WR; 57 K. J. Cloyd ILB; 53 Andrew Farmer OLB; 71 Cameron Fleming T; 66 Nick Gargiulo G; 91 Matt Henningsen DE; 30 Tanner McCalister SS; 90 Jordan Miller NT; 36 Quinton Newsome CB; 89 Donald Parham TE; 87 A. T. Perry WR; 78 Will Sherman T; 13 David Sills WR; 43 Keidron Smith FS; 35 Reese Taylor CB; 76 Calvin Throckmorton G; 86 Thomas Yassmin TE (IPP); Reserve: 75 Quinn Bailey T (IR); 73 Frank Crum T (NF-Inj.); 49 Alex Singleton ILB (IR); 32 Delarrin Turner-Yell FS (PUP); Rookies in italics 53 active, 4 reserve, 16 practice squad (1 exempt)

== Preseason ==
Week	Date	Opponent	Result	Record	Venue	Recap
1	August 11	at Indianapolis Colts	W 34–30	1–0	Lucas Oil Stadium	Recap
2	August 18	Green Bay Packers	W 27–2	2–0	Empower Field at Mile High	Recap
3	August 25	Arizona Cardinals	W 38–12	3–0	Empower Field at Mile High	Recap

== Regular season ==
=== Schedule ===
Week	Date	Opponent	Result	Record	Venue	Recap
1	September 8	at Seattle Seahawks	**L** 20–26	0–1	Lumen Field	Recap
2	September 15	Pittsburgh Steelers	**L** 6–13	0–2	Empower Field at Mile High	Recap
3	September 22	at Tampa Bay Buccaneers	**W** 26–7	1–2	Raymond James Stadium	Recap
4	September 29	at New York Jets	**W** 10–9	2–2	MetLife Stadium	Recap
5	October 6	**Las Vegas Raiders**	**W** 34–18	3–2	Empower Field at Mile High	Recap
6	October 13	**Los Angeles Chargers**	**L** 16–23	3–3	Empower Field at Mile High	Recap
7	October 17	at New Orleans Saints	**W** 33–10	4–3	Caesars Superdome	Recap
8	October 27	Carolina Panthers	**W** 28–14	5–3	Empower Field at Mile High	Recap
9	November 3	at Baltimore Ravens	**L** 10–41	5–4	M&T Bank Stadium	Recap
10	November 10	at **Kansas City Chiefs**	**L** 14–16	5–5	Arrowhead Stadium	Recap
11	November 17	Atlanta Falcons	**W** 38–6	6–5	Empower Field at Mile High	Recap
12	November 24	at **Las Vegas Raiders**	**W** 29–19	7–5	Allegiant Stadium	Recap
13	December 2	Cleveland Browns	**W** 41–32	8–5	Empower Field at Mile High	Recap
14	Bye					
15	December 15	Indianapolis Colts	**W** 31–13	9–5	Empower Field at Mile High	Recap
16	December 19	at **Los Angeles Chargers**	**L** 27–34	9–6	SoFi Stadium	Recap
17	December 28	at Cincinnati Bengals	**L** 24–30 (OT)	9–7	Paycor Stadium	Recap
18	January 5	**Kansas City Chiefs**	**W** 38–0	10–7	Empower Field at Mile High	Recap

Note: Intra-division opponents are in bold text.

=== Game summaries ===
==== Week 1: at Seattle Seahawks ====
Week 1: Denver Broncos at Seattle Seahawks – Game summary

Quarter	1	2	3	4	Total
Broncos	3	10	0	7	**20**
**Seahawks**	3	6	10	7	**26**

at Lumen Field, Seattle, Washington

- Date: September 8
- Game time: 2:05 p.m. MDT/1:05 p.m. PDT
- Game weather: Sunny, 73 °F (23 °C)
- Game attendance: 68,714
- Referee: Brad Allen
- TV announcers (CBS): Spero Dedes, Adam Archuleta and Aditi Kinkhabwala
- Recap, Game Book

Game information

**First quarter**

- DEN – Wil Lutz 35-yard field goal, 12:36. Broncos 3–0. **Drive: 4 plays, 3 yards, 1:36.**
- SEA – Jason Myers 50-yard field goal, 2:41. Tied 3–3. **Drive: 7 plays, 46 yards, 2:57.**

**Second quarter**

- DEN – Penalty on Anthony Bradford enforced in the end zone for a safety, 11:22. Broncos 5–3.
- DEN – Wil Lutz 30-yard field goal, 8:45. Broncos 8–3. **Drive: 4 plays, −2 yards, 1:30.**
- SEA – Geno Smith 34-yard run (pass failed), 5:55. Seahawks 9–8. **Drive: 5 plays, 70 yards, 2:50.**
- DEN – Zach Charbonnet tackled in the end zone by Zach Allen and Jonathon Cooper for a safety, 4:24. Broncos 10–9.
- DEN – Wil Lutz 45-yard field goal, 0:02. Broncos 13–9. **Drive: 5 plays, 26 yards, 0:29.**

**Third quarter**

- SEA – Kenneth Walker III 23-yard run (Jason Myers kick), 10:44. Seahawks 16–13. **Drive: 6 plays, 61 yards, 2:47.**
- SEA – Jason Myers 28-yard field goal, 4:09. Seahawks 19–13. **Drive: 10 plays, 37 yards, 3:54.**

**Fourth quarter**

- SEA – Zach Charbonnet 30-yard pass from Geno Smith (Jason Myers kick), 14:54. Seahawks 26–13. **Drive: 6 plays, 80 yards, 2:43.**
- DEN – Bo Nix 4-yard run (Wil Lutz kick), 2:09. Seahawks 26–20. **Drive: 7 plays, 54 yards, 2:19.**

**Top passers**

- DEN – Bo Nix – 26/42, 138 yards, 2 INT
- SEA – Geno Smith – 18/25, 171 yards, TD, INT

**Top rushers**

- DEN – Bo Nix – 5 rushes, 35 yards, TD
- SEA – Kenneth Walker III – 20 rushes, 103 yards, TD

**Top receivers**

- DEN – Josh Reynolds – 5 receptions, 45 yards
- SEA – Tyler Lockett – 6 receptions, 77 yards

For the second time in three seasons, the Broncos kicked off their season on the road against the Seattle Seahawks. The Broncos' defense forced an interception off Seahawks' quarterback Geno Smith on the game's opening possession; however, the Broncos were forced to settle for a 35-yard field goal by placekicker Wil Lutz. The Seahawks responded near the end of the second quarter, with a 50-yard field goal by placekicker Jason Myers. Early in the second quarter, the Broncos' offense reached the Seahawks's 21-yard line on their next possession; however, rookie quarterback Bo Nix, the team's first-round draft selection, was intercepted by Julian Love at the 1-yard line. On the Seahawks' next play from scrimmage, guard Anthony Bradford was penalized for offensive holding in the end zone for a safety. For a second time, the Broncos advanced deep into Seahawks' territory, but were once again forced to settle another short field goal by Lutz—from 30 yards out. The Seahawks took a 9–8 lead, with Smith rushing for a 34-yard touchdown, with an unsuccessful two-point conversion attempt. The Broncos went three-and-out, and punter Riley Dixon pinned the Seahawks back to their own 1-yard line, with a 65-yard punt. The Broncos' defense recorded their second safety of the second quarter, with defensive end Zach Allen and linebacker Jonathon Cooper tackling Seahawks' running back Zach Charbonnet in the end zone. Following an exchange of punts, Lutz added a 45-yard field goal to give the Broncos a 13–9 lead at halftime.

After the Broncos went three-and-out to start the second half, the Seahawks reeled off 17 unanswered points. First, running back Kenneth Walker III ran up the middle for a 23-yard touchdown. After Broncos' running back Jaleel McLaughlin lost a fumble near midfield, Myers added a 28-yard field goal. After another three-and-out by the Broncos' offense, Smith connected with Charbonnet on a 30-yard touchdown pass on the first play of the fourth quarter, giving the Seahawks a 26–13 lead. With 5:37 left in the fourth quarter, Nix was intercepted by Tariq Woolen near midfield. After forcing a Seahawks' punt, the Broncos finally reached the end zone, with Nix scrambling for a 4-yard touchdown run with 2:17 remaining in the fourth quarter. However, the Broncos were unable to prevent the Seahawks from running out the clock, as Smith completed a game-clinching 9-yard pass to wide receiver Tyler Lockett on a 3rd-and-6. In his NFL debut, Nix completed 26 passed in 42 attempts for 138 yards, but the Broncos' offense went 5-for-18 on third down and struggled against the Seahawks' defense.

==== Week 2: vs. Pittsburgh Steelers ====
Week 2: Pittsburgh Steelers at Denver Broncos – Game summary

Quarter	1	2	3	4	Total
**Steelers**	7	3	3	0	**13**
Broncos	0	0	0	6	**6**

at Empower Field at Mile High, Denver, Colorado

- Date: September 15
- Game time: 2:25 p.m. MDT
- Game weather: Partly cloudy, 88 °F (31 °C)
- Game attendance: 74,215
- Referee: Clete Blakeman
- TV announcers (CBS): Spero Dedes, Adam Archuleta and Aditi Kinkhabwala
- Recap, Game Book

Game information

**First quarter**

- PIT – Darnell Washington 5-yard pass from Justin Fields (Chris Boswell kick), 1:56. Steelers 7–0. **Drive: 12 plays, 78 yards, 7:34.**

**Second quarter**

- PIT – Chris Boswell 22-yard field goal, 0:00. Steelers 10–0. **Drive: 7 plays, 57 yards, 2:28.**

**Third quarter**

- PIT – Chris Boswell 53-yard field goal, 4:16. Steelers 13–0. **Drive: 4 plays, 45 yards, 1:54.**

**Fourth quarter**

- DEN – Wil Lutz 35-yard field goal, 10:42. Steelers 13–3. **Drive: 12 plays, 54 yards, 5:33.**
- DEN – Wil Lutz 29-yard field goal, 1:53. Steelers 13–6. **Drive: 9 plays, 69 yards, 2:51.**

**Top passers**

- PIT – Justin Fields – 13/20, 117 yards, TD
- DEN – Bo Nix – 20/35, 246 yards, 2 INT

**Top rushers**

- PIT – Najee Harris – 17 rushes, 69 yards
- DEN – Bo Nix – 4 rushes, 25 yards

**Top receivers**

- PIT – Pat Freiermuth – 4 receptions, 39 yards
- DEN – Josh Reynolds – 4 receptions, 93 yards

The Broncos' offense struggled against the Steelers' defense, failed to score a touchdown, and only converted twice on third down in 12 attempts, in a 13–6 loss. Steelers' quarterback Justin Fields threw a 5-yard touchdown to tight end Darnell Washington in the first quarter—the game's only touchdown—and placekicker Chris Boswell added two field goals—a 22-yarder just before halftime, followed by a 53-yarder in the third quarter. The Broncos trailed 10–0 midway through the third quarter, and had a 1st-and-goal at the Steelers' 7-yard line, following a 49-yard pass completion from quarterback Bo Nix to wide receiver Josh Reynolds. However, Nix was intercepted in the end zone for a touchback two plays later. The Broncos were forced to settle for two field goals by placekicker Wil Lutz in the fourth quarter—a 35-yarder, followed by a 29-yarder at the two-minute warning. After forcing a Steelers' punt and exhausting all of their team timeouts, the Broncos attempted a rally with only 9 seconds remaining, but Nix was intercepted at the Steelers' 40-yard line, ending the game.

==== Week 3: at Tampa Bay Buccaneers ====
Week 3: Denver Broncos at Tampa Bay Buccaneers – Game summary

Quarter	1	2	3	4	Total
**Broncos**	14	6	0	6	**26**
Buccaneers	0	7	0	0	**7**

at Raymond James Stadium, Tampa, Florida

- Date: September 22
- Game time: 1:00 p.m. EDT/11:00 a.m. MDT
- Game weather: Sunny, 87 °F (31 °C)
- Game attendance: 62,738
- Referee: Alan Eck
- TV announcers (Fox): Tim Brando, Matt Millen and Sarah Kustok
- Recap, Game Book

Game information

**First quarter**

- DEN – Bo Nix 3-yard run (Wil Lutz kick), 11:05. Broncos 7–0. **Drive: 6 plays, 70 yards, 3:55.**
- DEN – Jaleel McLaughlin 1-yard run (Wil Lutz kick), 2:56. Broncos 14–0. **Drive: 4 plays, 9 yards, 2:14.**

**Second quarter**

- DEN – Wil Lutz 43-yard field goal, 9:25. Broncos 17–0. **Drive: 13 plays, 41 yards, 6:52.**
- TB – Chris Godwin 5-yard pass from Baker Mayfield (Chase McLaughlin kick), 1:50. Broncos 17–7. **Drive: 6 plays, 67 yards, 2:45.**
- DEN – Wil Lutz 38-yard field goal, 0:02. Broncos 20–7. **Drive: 9 plays, 50 yards, 1:48.**

**Third quarter**

- No scoring plays.

**Fourth quarter**

- DEN – Wil Lutz 33-yard field goal, 14:52. Broncos 23–7. **Drive: 15 plays, 79 yards, 7:57.**
- DEN – Wil Lutz 43-yard field goal, 7:30. Broncos 26–7. **Drive: 5 plays, 50 yards, 2:22.**

**Top passers**

- DEN – Bo Nix – 25/36, 216 yards
- TB – Baker Mayfield – 25/33, 163 yards, TD, INT

**Top rushers**

- DEN – Tyler Badie – 9 rushes, 70 yards
- TB – Bucky Irving – 9 rushes, 70 yards

**Top receivers**

- DEN – Courtland Sutton – 7 receptions, 68 yards
- TB – Chris Godwin – 6 receptions, 53 yards, TD

The Broncos jumped out to a 17–0 lead over the Buccaneers, with a pair of rushing touchdowns—a 3-yarder by quarterback Bo Nix, followed by a 1-yarder by running back Jaleel McLaughlin and a 43-yard field goal by placekicker Wil Lutz in the second quarter. The latter touchdown occurred after an interception of Buccaneers' quarterback Baker Mayfield. Following a fumble by Broncos' running back Javonte Williams, Mayfield got the Buccaneers on the scoreboard, with a 5-yard touchdown pass to wide receiver Chris Godwin just after the two-minute warning. The Broncos' defense held the Buccaneers scoreless for the remainder of the game, and in the process, sacking Mayfield seven times. Lutz added three more field goals—one just before halftime and two in the fourth quarter.

==== Week 4: at New York Jets ====
Week 4: Denver Broncos at New York Jets – Game summary

Quarter	1	2	3	4	Total
**Broncos**	0	0	7	3	**10**
Jets	0	6	0	3	**9**

at MetLife Stadium, East Rutherford, New Jersey

- Date: September 29
- Game time: 1:00 p.m. EDT/11:00 a.m. MDT
- Game weather: Rain, 67 °F (19 °C)
- Game attendance: 82,243
- Referee: Ronald Torbert
- TV announcers (CBS): Ian Eagle, Charles Davis and Evan Washburn
- Recap, Game Book

Game information

**First quarter**

- No scoring plays.

**Second quarter**

- NYJ – Greg Zuerlein 23-yard field goal, 14:51. Jets 3–0. **Drive: 6 plays, 29 yards, 2:16.**
- NYJ – Greg Zuerlein 35-yard field goal, 0:00. Jets 6–0. **Drive: 9 plays, 56 yards, 1:47.**

**Third quarter**

- DEN – Courtland Sutton 8-yard pass from Bo Nix (Wil Lutz kick), 3:08. Broncos 7–6. **Drive: 11 plays, 87 yards, 5:27.**

**Fourth quarter**

- NYJ – Greg Zuerlein 40-yard field goal, 13:34. Jets 9–7. **Drive: 11 plays, 53 yards, 4:34.**
- DEN – Wil Lutz 47-yard field goal, 8:55. Broncos 10–9. **Drive: 8 plays, 41 yards, 4:39.**

**Top passers**

- DEN – Bo Nix – 12/25, 60 yards, TD
- NYJ – Aaron Rodgers – 24/42, 225 yards

**Top rushers**

- DEN – Javonte Williams – 16 rushes, 77 yards
- NYJ – Braelon Allen – 8 rushes, 34 yards

**Top receivers**

- DEN – Courtland Sutton – 3 receptions, 60 yards, TD
- NYJ – Mike Williams – 4 receptions, 67 yards

A scoreless first quarter in rainy conditions featured a defensive struggle, including a forced fumble off Jets' wide receiver Garrett Wilson by the Broncos' defense at the Jets' 30-yard line. However, the Broncos were unable to take advantage of the turnover on their first possession as the result of an offensive pass interference penalty and a loss of 4 yards. The Broncos' offense went three-and-out on three of their next four possessions, and did not earn their first first-down until the 10:15 mark of the second quarter. Two field goals by Jets' placekicker Greg Zuerlein—a 23-yarder at the beginning of the second quarter and a 35-yarder at the end of the first half—gave the Jets a 6–0 halftime lead. The first field goal occurred after a lost fumble by Broncos' running back Tyler Badie and a false start penalty after the Jets had a 4th-and-goal at the 1-yard line. By halftime, Broncos' quarterback Bo Nix had –7 yards on 15 pass attempts.

Following an exchange of punts to start the second half, Nix finally threw his first touchdown pass of the season—an 8-yarder to wide receiver Courtland Sutton in the back of the end zone. The Jets retook the lead on their next possession, with Zuerlein's third field goal of the game—a 40-yarder early in the fourth quarter. The Broncos responded, with a 47-yard field goal by placekicker Wil Lutz at the 8:59 mark of the fourth quarter. Following another exchange of punts, the Jets were attempting to take the lead just after the two-minute warning, and faced a 4th-and-10 at their own 45-yard line. However, quarterback Aaron Rodgers was sacked for a 10-yard loss—one of five sacks by the Broncos' defense. The Broncos had a chance to run out the clock; however, after gaining only three yards, Lutz missed wide-right on a 50-yard field goal that would have forced the Jets to score a touchdown. With 1:27 remaining in the game, the Jets' final possession of the game started at their own 40-yard line. Five plays later, Zuerlein had an opportunity for a 50-yard, game-winning field goal; however, like Lutz, Zuerlein's 50-yard field goal attempt also missed wide-right, sealing the win for the Broncos.

==== Week 5: vs. Las Vegas Raiders ====
Week 5: Las Vegas Raiders at Denver Broncos – Game summary

Quarter	1	2	3	4	Total
Raiders	10	0	0	8	**18**
**Broncos**	0	13	7	14	**34**

at Empower Field at Mile High, Denver, Colorado

- Date: October 6
- Game time: 2:05 p.m. MDT
- Game weather: Sunny, 73 °F (23 °C)
- Game attendance: 72,825
- Referee: Craig Wrolstad
- TV announcers (Fox): Kevin Kugler, Daryl Johnston and Laura Okmin
- Recap, Game Book

Game information

**First quarter**

- LV – Brock Bowers 57-yard pass from Gardner Minshew (Daniel Carlson kick), 12:57. Raiders 7–0. **Drive: 4 plays, 70 yards, 2:03.**
- LV – Daniel Carlson 40-yard field goal, 1:27. Raiders 10–0. **Drive: 13 plays, 68 yards, 8:06.**

**Second quarter**

- DEN – Wil Lutz 51-yard field goal, 12:23. Raiders 10–3. **Drive: 7 plays, 26 yards, 4:04.**
- DEN – Patrick Surtain II 100-yard interception return for touchdown (Wil Lutz kick), 8:43. Tied 10–10.
- DEN – Wil Lutz 44-yard field goal, 0:00. Broncos 13–10. **Drive: 5 plays, 38 yards, 0:27.**

**Third quarter**

- DEN – Jaleel McLaughlin 4-yard pass from Bo Nix (Wil Lutz kick), 7:01. Broncos 20–10. **Drive: 6 plays, 50 yards, 3:00.**

**Fourth quarter**

- DEN – Bo Nix 1-yard run (Wil Lutz kick), 10:12. Broncos 27–10. **Drive: 8 plays, 58 yards, 4:48.**
- DEN – Josh Reynolds 9-yard pass from Bo Nix (Wil Lutz kick), 8:14. Broncos 34–10. **Drive: 4 plays, 39 yards, 1:53.**
- LV – Ameer Abdullah 3-yard run (Alexander Mattison run), 4:01. Broncos 34–18. **Drive: 12 plays, 75 yards, 4:13.**

**Top passers**

- LV – Gardner Minshew – 12/17, 137 yards, TD, 2 INT
- DEN – Bo Nix – 19/27, 206 yards, 2 TD

**Top rushers**

- LV – Ameer Abdullah – 5 rushes, 42 yards, TD
- DEN – Javonte Williams – 13 rushes, 61 yards

**Top receivers**

- LV – Brock Bowers – 8 receptions, 97 yards, TD
- DEN – Javonte Williams – 5 receptions, 50 yards

The Broncos debuted their new orange throwback uniforms, which the team had not worn since 2001. The Raiders took a 10–0 lead in the first quarter, with quarterback Gardner Minshew connecting with tight end Brock Bowers on a 57-yard touchdown pass, followed by a 40-yard field goal by placekicker Daniel Carlson. After a 51-yard field goal by placekicker Wil Lutz got the Broncos on the scoreboard early in the second quarter, the Raiders marched down the field, and were threatening to add to their lead, with a first-and-goal at the 5-yard line. However, Broncos' cornerback Patrick Surtain II changed the momentum of the game, with a 100-yard interception return for a touchdown off Minshew. After both teams exchange punts, a 44-yard field goal by Lutz just before halftime gave the Broncos the lead for good, and in the second half, quarterback Bo Nix accounted for three touchdowns— two passing, and another on a 1-yard sneak—capping off 34 unanswered points by the Broncos. It was the most points that the Broncos scored in a single game since 2021. The Raiders attempted a rally, with a 3-yard touchdown run by running back Ameer Abdullah (with a successful two-point conversion) with four minutes remaining in the game, but the Broncos' lead was too much for the Raiders to overcome. With the win, the Broncos snapped an 8-game losing streak against the Raiders. In addition, Nix became the first rookie quarterback in franchise history to win three consecutive games.

==== Week 6: vs. Los Angeles Chargers ====
Week 6: Los Angeles Chargers at Denver Broncos – Game summary

Quarter	1	2	3	4	Total
**Chargers**	10	10	3	0	**23**
Broncos	0	0	0	16	**16**

at Empower Field at Mile High, Denver, Colorado

- Date: October 13
- Game time: 2:05 p.m. MDT
- Game weather: Partly cloudy, 65 °F (18 °C)
- Game attendance: 70,743
- Referee: Tra Blake
- TV announcers (CBS): Andrew Catalon, Tiki Barber, Jason McCourty and A. J. Ross
- Recap, Game Book

Game information

**First quarter**

- LAC – Cameron Dicker 20-yard field goal, 9:26. Chargers 3–0. **Drive: 9 plays, 29 yards, 4:11.**
- LAC – Kimani Vidal 38-yard pass from Justin Herbert (Cameron Dicker kick), 4:59. Chargers 10–0. **Drive: 6 plays, 83 yards, 2:53.**

**Second quarter**

- LAC – Cameron Dicker 33-yard field goal, 6:21. Chargers 13–0. **Drive: 20 plays, 76 yards, 10:29.**
- LAC – J. K. Dobbins 4-yard run (Cameron Dicker kick), 1:00. Chargers 20–0. **Drive: 11 plays, 56 yards, 3:32.**

**Third quarter**

- LAC – Cameron Dicker 46-yard field goal, 2:35. Chargers 23–0. **Drive: 11 plays, 63 yards, 4:58.**

**Fourth quarter**

- DEN – Troy Franklin 2-yard pass from Bo Nix (Wil Lutz kick), 10:06. Chargers 23–7. **Drive: 8 plays, 95 yards, 4:03.**
- DEN – Courtland Sutton 15-yard pass from Bo Nix (pass failed), 5:27. Chargers 23–13. **Drive: 8 plays, 64 yards, 3:03.**
- DEN – Wil Lutz 40-yard field goal, 0:59. Chargers 23–16. **Drive: 8 plays, 74 yards, 1:27.**

**Top passers**

- LAC – Justin Herbert – 21/34, 237 yards, TD
- DEN – Bo Nix – 19/33, 216 yards, 2 TD, INT

**Top rushers**

- LAC – J. K. Dobbins – 25 rushes, 96 yards, TD
- DEN – Bo Nix – 6 rushes, 61 yards

**Top receivers**

- LAC – Simi Fehoko – 2 receptions, 44 yards
- DEN – Devaughn Vele – 4 receptions, 78 yards

Throughout the first three quarters, the Chargers built a 23–0 lead and dominated the time of possession by a 2-to-1 ratio over the Broncos. The Chargers converted two Broncos' turnovers—an interception off Broncos' quarterback Bo Nix and a fumble by running back Javonte Williams—into 10 points. Broncos' cornerback Patrick Surtain II left the game after suffering a concussion on the first defensive play from scrimmage, and the defense was unable to get off the field, surrendering three field goals by Chargers' placekicker Cameron Dicker and two touchdowns—a 38-yard pass from quarterback Justin Herbert to wide receiver Kimani Vidal and a 4-yard rush by running back J. K. Dobbins. In addition, the Broncos did not force a Chargers' punt until the initial possession of the second half and were booed off at halftime. The Broncos' offense struggled against the Chargers' defense, failing to advance past midfield on seven of their first eight possessions. The Broncos' best offensive play—a 46-yard pass completion from Nix to wide receiver Courtland Sutton to the Chargers' 16-yard line just before halftime—was negated by an offensive holding penalty on guard Quinn Meinerz.

The Broncos' finally got on the scoreboard early in the fourth quarter, with Nix connecting on a 2-yard touchdown pass to wide receiver Troy Franklin in the back of the end zone. After forcing a Chargers' punt, Nix threw his next touchdown pass—a 15-yarder to Sutton in the back of the end zone. However, the two-point conversion attempt, which would have pulled the Broncos to within a one-score deficit, was unsuccessful, leaving the score at 23–13 at the 5:27 mark of the fourth quarter. After forcing one more Chargers' punt, and without any timeouts, the Broncos narrowed the Chargers' lead to 23–16, with a 40-yard field goal by placekicker Wil Lutz. However, the onside kick attempt was unsuccessful, ending the Broncos' rally attempt.

==== Week 7: at New Orleans Saints ====
Week 7: Denver Broncos at New Orleans Saints – Game summary

Quarter	1	2	3	4	Total
**Broncos**	3	13	10	7	**33**
Saints	0	3	0	7	**10**

at Caesars Superdome, New Orleans, Louisiana

- Date: October 17
- Game time: 7:15 p.m. CDT/6:15 p.m. MDT
- Game weather: None (indoor stadium)
- Game attendance: 70,008
- Referee: Land Clark
- TV announcers (KMGH/Prime Video): Al Michaels, Kirk Herbstreit and Kaylee Hartung
- Recap, Game Book

Game information

**First quarter**

- DEN – Wil Lutz 46-yard field goal, 5:28. Broncos 3–0. **Drive: 9 plays, 52 yards, 5:04.**

**Second quarter**

- DEN – Wil Lutz 32-yard field goal, 13:24. Broncos 6–0. **Drive: 10 plays, 42 yards, 5:15.**
- DEN – Javonte Williams 8-yard run (Wil Lutz kick), 7:30. Broncos 13–0. **Drive: 8 plays, 86 yards, 4:44.**
- NO – Blake Grupe 35-yard field goal, 1:57. Broncos 13–3. **Drive: 11 plays, 62 yards, 5:33.**
- DEN – Wil Lutz 52-yard field goal, 0:16. Broncos 16–3. **Drive: 10 plays, 38 yards, 1:41.**

**Third quarter**

- DEN – Wil Lutz 38-yard field goal, 10:24. Broncos 19–3. **Drive: 7 plays, 46 yards, 3:45.**
- DEN – Javonte Williams 5-yard run (Wil Lutz kick), 5:53. Broncos 26–3. **Drive: 5 plays, 69 yards, 3:00.**

**Fourth quarter**

- DEN – Cody Barton 52-yard fumble return (Wil Lutz kick), 4:06. Broncos 33–3. **Drive: 6 plays, −1 yard, 2:04.**
- NO – Cedrick Wilson Jr. 12-yard pass from Jake Haener (Blake Grupe kick), 1:22. Broncos 33–10. **Drive: 11 plays, 79 yards, 2:44.**

**Top passers**

- DEN – Bo Nix – 16/26, 164 yards
- NO – Spencer Rattler – 25/35, 172 yards

**Top rushers**

- DEN – Javonte Williams – 14 rushes, 88 yards, 2 TD
- NO – Kendre Miller – 6 rushes, 36 yards

**Top receivers**

- DEN – Troy Franklin – 5 receptions, 50 yards
- NO – Cedrick Wilson Jr. – 6 receptions, 57 yards, TD

Broncos' running back Javonte Williams rushed for two touchdowns, linebacker Cody Barton returned a fumble for a touchdown and placekicker Wil Lutz kicked four field goals, in a 33–10 win over the Saints. The Broncos accumulated 225 rushing yards, the most in a single game since 2013, and the defense recorded six sacks of Saints' quarterback Spencer Rattler, who was starting in place of the injured Derek Carr. The game marked Broncos' head coach Sean Payton's return to New Orleans, where he coached the Saints from 2006–2021. In addition, Payton became the 8th head coach to win a game against all 32 NFL teams.

==== Week 8: vs. Carolina Panthers ====
Week 8: Carolina Panthers at Denver Broncos – Game summary

Quarter	1	2	3	4	Total
Panthers	7	0	0	7	**14**
**Broncos**	0	21	7	0	**28**

at Empower Field at Mile High, Denver, Colorado

- Date: October 27
- Game time: 2:25 p.m. MDT
- Game weather: Partly sunny, 77 °F (25 °C)
- Game attendance: 76,135
- Referee: Alex Kemp
- TV announcers (CBS): Chris Lewis, Jason McCourty and Amanda Guerra
- Recap, Game Book

Game information

**First quarter**

- CAR – Xavier Legette 6-yard pass from Bryce Young (Eddy Piñeiro kick), 7:12. Panthers 7–0. **Drive: 10 plays, 49 yards, 6:27.**

**Second quarter**

- DEN – Nate Adkins 3-yard pass from Bo Nix (Wil Lutz kick), 12:29. Tied 7–7. **Drive: 7 plays, 55 yards, 2:55.**
- DEN – Adam Trautman 19-yard pass from Bo Nix (Wil Lutz kick), 6:51. Broncos 14–7. **Drive: 7 plays, 92 yards, 3:06.**
- DEN – Bo Nix 1-yard run (Wil Lutz kick), 1:12. Broncos 21–7. **Drive: 10 plays, 48 yards, 3:29.**

**Third quarter**

- DEN – Jaleel McLaughlin 9-yard pass from Bo Nix (Wil Lutz kick), 6:49. Broncos 28–7. **Drive: 4 plays, 23 yards, 1:35.**

**Fourth quarter**

- CAR – Jalen Coker 15-yard pass from Bryce Young (Eddy Piñeiro kick), 0:18. Broncos 28–14. **Drive: 10 plays, 98 yards, 1:55.**

**Top passers**

- CAR – Bryce Young – 24/37, 224 yards, 2 TD, 2 INT
- DEN – Bo Nix – 28/37, 284 yards, 3 TD

**Top rushers**

- CAR – Chuba Hubbard – 15 rushes, 56 yards
- DEN – Jaleel McLaughlin – 8 rushes, 47 yards

**Top receivers**

- CAR – Jalen Coker – 4 receptions, 78 yards, TD
- DEN – Courtland Sutton – 8 receptions, 100 yards

After losing a fumble on the game's opening possession, the Broncos spotted the Panthers an early 7–0 lead, with a 6-yard touchdown pass from quarterback Bryce Young to wide receiver Xavier Legette. The Broncos responded with three touchdowns in the second quarter. Quarterback Bo Nix connected on a pair of touchdown passes—3- and 19-yarders to tight ends Nate Adkins and Adam Trautman—and scored another on a 1-yard sneak just before halftime. After a Panthers' fake punt attempt went awry midway through the third quarter, Nix threw his third touchdown pass of the game—a 9-yarder to running back Jaleel McLaughlin. The Broncos' defensive secondary intercepted two passes by Young deep in Broncos' territory—one by cornerback Patrick Surtain II late in the third quarter, and the other by cornerback Ja'Quan McMillian midway through the fourth quarter. After the Broncos' lost a fumble deep in Panthers' territory just before the two-minute warning, the Panthers scored a late touchdown with only 23 seconds left in the game—a 15-yard pass from Young to wide receiver Jalen Coker. However, the game had already been decided in the Broncos' favor. Wide receiver Courtland Sutton recorded his first 100+ yard receiving game since Week 2 of the 2022 season. Nik Bonitto earned a sack to extend his streak of consecutive games with a sack to six, tying Von Miller's streak in 2018.

==== Week 9: at Baltimore Ravens ====
Week 9: Denver Broncos at Baltimore Ravens – Game summary

Quarter	1	2	3	4	Total
Broncos	0	10	0	0	**10**
**Ravens**	7	17	14	3	**41**

at M&T Bank Stadium, Baltimore, Maryland

- Date: November 3
- Game time: 1:00 p.m. EST/11:00 a.m. MST
- Game weather: Clear, 57 °F (14 °C)
- Game attendance: 71,051
- Referee: Adrian Hill
- TV announcers (CBS): Jim Nantz, Tony Romo and Tracy Wolfson
- Recap, Game Book

Game information

**First quarter**

- BAL – Derrick Henry 7-yard run (Justin Tucker kick), 2:18. Ravens 7–0. **Drive: 7 plays, 57 yards, 3:59.**

**Second quarter**

- BAL – Justin Tucker 33-yard field goal, 12:04. Ravens 10–0. **Drive: 5 plays, 52 yards, 2:21.**
- DEN – Bo Nix 2-yard pass from Courtland Sutton (Wil Lutz kick), 7:15. Ravens 10–7. **Drive: 11 plays, 70 yards, 4:49.**
- BAL – Zay Flowers 7-yard pass from Lamar Jackson (Justin Tucker kick), 3:47. Ravens 17–7. **Drive: 7 plays, 63 yards, 3:28.**
- DEN – Wil Lutz 37-yard field goal, 0:54. Ravens 17–10. **Drive: 11 plays, 51 yards, 2:53.**
- BAL – Zay Flowers 53-yard pass from Lamar Jackson (Justin Tucker kick), 0:16. Ravens 24–10. **Drive: 2 plays, 70 yards, 0:38.**

**Third quarter**

- BAL – Derrick Henry 6-yard run (Justin Tucker kick), 9:36. Ravens 31–10. **Drive: 10 plays, 70 yards, 5:24.**
- BAL – Patrick Ricard 3-yard pass from Lamar Jackson (Justin Tucker kick), 1:21. Ravens 38–10. **Drive: 10 plays, 79 yards, 6:11.**

**Fourth quarter**

- BAL – Justin Tucker 37-yard field goal, 12:49. Ravens 41–10. **Drive: 5 plays, 20 yards, 2:15.**

**Top passers**

- DEN – Bo Nix – 19/33, 223 yards, INT
- BAL – Lamar Jackson – 16/19, 280 yards, 3 TD

**Top rushers**

- DEN – Javonte Williams – 12 rushes, 42 yards
- BAL – Derrick Henry – 23 rushes, 106 yards, 2 TD

**Top receivers**

- DEN – Courtland Sutton – 7 receptions, 122 yards
- BAL – Zay Flowers – 5 receptions, 127 yards, 2 TD

The Ravens took advantage of two Broncos' turnovers on downs, with a 7-yard touchdown run by running back Derrick Henry, followed in the second quarter by a 33-yard field goal by placekicker Justin Tucker. The Broncos got on the scoreboard midway through the second quarter, with quarterback Bo Nix receiving a 2-yard touchdown pass from wide receiver Courtland Sutton on a Philly Special pass play. The Ravens responded, with quarterback Lamar Jackson throwing a 7-yard touchdown pass to wide receiver Zay Flowers. After a 9-yard touchdown scramble by Nix was nullified by an offensive holding penalty on tackle Garett Bolles, the Broncos were forced to settle for a 37-yard field goal by placekicker Wil Lutz to narrow the Ravens' lead to 17–10. However, the Broncos were held scoreless for the remainder of the game, and the Ravens pulled away. Jackson connected on two more touchdown passes, Henry rushed for another, and Tucker added another field goal for a 41–10 Ravens' win. With the loss, the Broncos dropped to 1–8 all-time in Baltimore, including the postseason.

==== Week 10: at Kansas City Chiefs ====
Week 10: Denver Broncos at Kansas City Chiefs – Game summary

Quarter	1	2	3	4	Total
Broncos	0	14	0	0	**14**
**Chiefs**	0	10	3	3	**16**

at Arrowhead Stadium, Kansas City, Missouri

- Date: November 10
- Game time: 12:00 p.m. CST/11:00 a.m. MST
- Game weather: 57 °F (14 °C)
- Game attendance: 73,704
- Referee: Brad Allen
- TV announcers (CBS): Kevin Harlan, Trent Green and Melanie Collins
- Recap, Game Book

Game information

**First quarter**

- No scoring plays.

**Second quarter**

- DEN – Devaughn Vele 6-yard pass from Bo Nix (Wil Lutz kick), 14:20. Broncos 7–0. **Drive: 9 plays, 80 yards, 4:40.**
- KC – Harrison Butker 36-yard field goal, 9:02. Broncos 7–3. **Drive: 10 plays, 52 yards, 5:18.**
- DEN – Courtland Sutton 32-yard pass from Bo Nix (Wil Lutz kick), 6:39. Broncos 14–3. **Drive: 5 plays, 70 yards, 2:23.**
- KC – Travis Kelce 2-yard pass from Patrick Mahomes (Harrison Butker kick), 1:44. Broncos 14–10. **Drive: 11 plays, 70 yards, 4:55.**

**Third quarter**

- KC – Harrison Butker 28-yard field goal, 3:51. Broncos 14–13. **Drive: 16 plays, 65 yards, 7:16.**

**Fourth quarter**

- KC – Harrison Butker 20-yard field goal, 5:57. Chiefs 16–14. **Drive: 10 plays, 44 yards, 4:43.**

**Top passers**

- DEN – Bo Nix – 22/30, 215 yards, 2 TD
- KC – Patrick Mahomes – 28/42, 266 yards, TD

**Top rushers**

- DEN – Audric Estimé – 14 rushes, 53 yards
- KC – Kareem Hunt – 14 rushes, 35 yards

**Top receivers**

- DEN – Courtland Sutton – 6 receptions, 70 yards, TD
- KC – Kareem Hunt – 7 receptions, 65 yards

The Broncos took a 14–3 lead into the second quarter; however, they were held scoreless for the remainder of the game, allowing the Chiefs to come back. After Chiefs' quarterback Patrick Mahomes led a 70-yard touchdown drive, culminating in a 2-yard touchdown pass to tight end Travis Kelce, Broncos' placekicker Wil Lutz missed short on a 60-yard field goal attempt before halftime. Two field goals from placekicker Harrison Butker—one apiece in the third and fourth quarters—allowed the Chiefs to take a 16–14 lead with 5:57 remaining in the game. The Broncos drove to the Chiefs' 18-yard line; however, Lutz's 35-yard field goal attempt was blocked as time expired, securing the win for the Chiefs.

==== Week 11: vs. Atlanta Falcons ====
Week 11: Atlanta Falcons at Denver Broncos – Game summary

Quarter	1	2	3	4	Total
Falcons	3	3	0	0	**6**
**Broncos**	7	14	7	10	**38**

at Empower Field at Mile High, Denver, Colorado

- Date: November 17
- Game time: 2:05 p.m. MST
- Game weather: Sunny, 55 °F (13 °C)
- Game attendance: 76,545
- Referee: Alan Eck
- TV announcers (Fox): Kevin Kugler, Daryl Johnston and Laura Okmin
- Recap, Game Book

Game information

**First quarter**

- DEN – Nate Adkins 12-yard pass from Bo Nix (Wil Lutz kick), 10:31. Broncos 7–0. **Drive: 9 plays, 70 yards, 4:29.**
- ATL – Younghoe Koo 41-yard field goal, 1:33. Broncos 7–3. **Drive: 13 plays, 48 yards, 8:58.**

**Second quarter**

- DEN – Javonte Williams 14-yard run (Wil Lutz kick), 6:16. Broncos 14–3. **Drive: 9 plays, 77 yards, 6:07.**
- ATL – Younghoe Koo 51-yard field goal, 2:48. Broncos 14–6. **Drive: 8 plays, 38 yards, 3:28.**
- DEN – Marvin Mims 12-yard pass from Bo Nix (Wil Lutz kick), 0:25. Broncos 21–6. **Drive: 10 plays, 70 yards, 2:23.**

**Third quarter**

- DEN – Troy Franklin 7-yard pass from Bo Nix (Wil Lutz kick), 9:05. Broncos 28–6. **Drive: 10 plays, 45 yards, 4:33.**

**Fourth quarter**

- DEN – Wil Lutz 45-yard field goal, 13:08. Broncos 31–6. **Drive: 8 plays, 41 yards, 4:37.**
- DEN – Lil'Jordan Humphrey 41-yard pass from Bo Nix (Wil Lutz kick), 9:03. Broncos 38–6. **Drive: 4 plays, 59 yards, 2:12.**

**Top passers**

- ATL – Kirk Cousins – 18/27, 173 yards, INT
- DEN – Bo Nix – 28/33, 307 yards, 4 TD

**Top rushers**

- ATL – Bijan Robinson – 12 rushes, 35 yards
- DEN – Javonte Williams – 9 rushes, 59 yards, TD

**Top receivers**

- ATL – Drake London – 3 receptions, 61 yards
- DEN – Courtland Sutton – 7 receptions, 78 yards

Broncos' quarterback Bo Nix threw four touchdown passes, and running back Javonte Williams rushed for another touchdown, in a 38–6 rout of the Falcons. After yielding two field goals to placekicker Younghoe Koo, the Broncos' defense held the Falcons scoreless in the second half, including four sacks of quarterback Kirk Cousins. Nix became only the second Broncos' rookie quarterback to throw for 300+ yards and four touchdowns in a single game, joining Marlin Briscoe. It was the Broncos' first victory over the Falcons since 2008, and in the process, the Broncos also swept the entire NFC South.

==== Week 12: at Las Vegas Raiders ====
Week 12: Denver Broncos at Las Vegas Raiders – Game summary

Quarter	1	2	3	4	Total
**Broncos**	3	6	7	13	**29**
Raiders	0	13	0	6	**19**

at Allegiant Stadium, Paradise, Nevada

- Date: November 24
- Game time: 2:05 p.m. MST/1:05 p.m. PST
- Game weather: None (indoor stadium)
- Game attendance: 62,460
- Referee: Ronald Torbert
- TV announcers (CBS): Kevin Harlan, Trent Green and Melanie Collins
- Recap, Game Book

Game information

**First quarter**

- DEN – Wil Lutz 38-yard field goal, 2:47. Broncos 3–0. **Drive: 8 plays, 47 yards, 5:07.**

**Second quarter**

- LV – Ameer Abdullah 6-yard pass from Gardner Minshew (Daniel Carlson kick), 13:36. Raiders 7–3. **Drive: 7 plays, 40 yards, 4:11.**
- DEN – Wil Lutz 53-yard field goal, 9:21. Raiders 7–6. **Drive: 8 plays, 35 yards, 4:15.**
- LV – Daniel Carlson 34-yard field goal, 3:48. Raiders 10–6. **Drive: 11 plays, 54 yards, 5:33.**
- DEN – Wil Lutz 54-yard field goal, 0:53. Raiders 10–9. **Drive: 8 plays, 34 yards, 2:55.**
- LV – Daniel Carlson 34-yard field goal, 0:00. Raiders 13–9. **Drive: 7 plays, 54 yards, 0:53.**

**Third quarter**

- DEN – Courtland Sutton 18-yard pass from Bo Nix (Wil Lutz kick), 10:49. Broncos 16–13. **Drive: 2 plays, 18 yards, 0:44.**

**Fourth quarter**

- DEN – Wil Lutz 45-yard field goal, 12:05. Broncos 19–13. **Drive: 10 plays, 26 yards, 4:22.**
- LV – Daniel Carlson 53-yard field goal, 8:59. Broncos 19–16. **Drive: 7 plays, 35 yards, 3:06.**
- DEN – Courtland Sutton 2-yard pass from Bo Nix (Wil Lutz kick), 5:30. Broncos 26–16. **Drive: 7 plays, 70 yards, 3:29.**
- LV – Daniel Carlson 22-yard field goal, 3:38. Broncos 26–19. **Drive: 11 plays, 66 yards, 1:52.**
- DEN – Wil Lutz 33-yard field goal, 1:56. Broncos 29–19. **Drive: 4 plays, 2 yards, 0:25.**

**Top passers**

- DEN – Bo Nix – 25/42, 273 yards, 2 TD
- LV – Gardner Minshew – 25/42, 230 yards, TD, INT

**Top rushers**

- DEN – Jaleel McLaughlin – 7 rushes, 44 yards
- LV – Sincere McCormick – 5 rushes, 33 yards

**Top receivers**

- DEN – Courtland Sutton – 8 receptions, 97 yards, 2 TD
- LV – Jakobi Meyers – 10 receptions, 121 yards

The Broncos trailed the Raiders 13–9 at halftime, after settling for three field goals by placekicker Wil Lutz—two of which were from 50+ yards out. Defensively, the Broncos yielded a 6-yard touchdown pass from Raiders' quarterback Gardner Minshew to running back Ameer Abdullah and two field goals by placekicker Daniel Carlson. After the Broncos went three-and-out to start the second half, Minshew was intercepted by safety Brandon Jones on an overthrow. The Broncos capitalized two plays later, with quarterback Bo Nix connecting on an 18-yard touchdown pass to wide receiver Courtland Sutton, which was the only scoring play of the third quarter. Each placekicker traded field goals early in the fourth quarter—a 45-yarder by Lutz, followed by a 53-yarder by Carlson. The Broncos increased their lead to 26–16 on their next possession, with another touchdown pass from Nix to Sutton—from 2 yards out. The Broncos' defense was able to keep the Raiders out of the end zone, and Carlson's fourth field goal of the game—from 22 yards out—pulled the Raiders to within a one-score deficit with 3:41 left in the game. After the Broncos went three-and-out, the Raiders attempted a rally; however, Minshew was injured after being sacked by linebackers Cody Barton and Jonathon Cooper, forcing backup quarterback Desmond Ridder to enter the game. Two plays later, Ridder was strip-sacked by linebacker Nik Bonitto, and Lutz' fifth field goal game—a 33-yarder at the two-minute warning—gave the Broncos a 29–19 lead that they would not relinquish.

With the win, the Broncos swept the Raiders for the first time since 2014, earned their first road victory over the Raiders since 2015, when the Raiders were then-based in Oakland (as well as their first ever win in Las Vegas), and were two games over .500 after twelve games for the first time since 2016. In addition, Bo Nix set the Broncos' franchise record for touchdown passes by a rookie in a single season, and Nik Bonitto became the first defensive lineman to record double-digit sacks in a single season since Von Miller and Bradley Chubb achieved that feat in 2018.

==== Week 13: vs. Cleveland Browns ====
Week 13: Cleveland Browns at Denver Broncos – Game summary

Quarter	1	2	3	4	Total
Browns	7	10	8	7	**32**
**Broncos**	7	14	10	10	**41**

at Empower Field at Mile High, Denver, Colorado

- Date: December 2
- Game time: 6:15 p.m. MST
- Game weather: Clear, 48 °F (9 °C)
- Game attendance: 68,306
- Referee: John Hussey
- TV announcers (KMGH/ESPN): Joe Buck, Troy Aikman and Lisa Salters
- Recap, Game Book

Game information

**First quarter**

- DEN – Javonte Williams 2-yard run (Wil Lutz kick), 4:13. Broncos 7–0. **Drive: 12 plays, 63 yards, 6:03.**
- CLE – David Njoku 8-yard pass from Jameis Winston (Dustin Hopkins kick), 1:09. Tied 7–7. **Drive: 5 plays, 70 yards, 3:04.**

**Second quarter**

- CLE – Dustin Hopkins 45-yard field goal, 8:49. Browns 10–7. **Drive: 9 plays, 42 yards, 3:43.**
- DEN – Michael Burton 1-yard run (Wil Lutz kick), 4:03. Broncos 14–10. **Drive: 6 plays, 67 yards, 3:04.**
- DEN – Nik Bonitto 71-yard interception return (Wil Lutz kick), 1:38. Broncos 21–10.
- CLE – David Njoku 4-yard pass from Jameis Winston (Dustin Hopkins kick), 0:13. Broncos 21–17. **Drive: 11 plays, 70 yards, 1:25.**

**Third quarter**

- DEN – Marvin Mims 93-yard pass from Bo Nix (Wil Lutz kick), 10:01. Broncos 28–17. **Drive: 3 plays, 92 yards, 0:33.**
- CLE – Jerry Jeudy 70-yard pass from Jameis Winston (Jameis Winston–Jerry Jeudy pass), 9:50. Broncos 28–25. **Drive: 1 play, 70 yards, 0:11.**
- DEN – Wil Lutz 36-yard field goal, 1:52. Broncos 31–25. **Drive: 10 plays, 78 yards, 4:06.**

**Fourth quarter**

- CLE – Nick Chubb 5-yard pass from Jameis Winston (Dustin Hopkins kick), 8:57. Browns 32–31. **Drive: 9 plays, 72 yards, 3:34.**
- DEN – Wil Lutz 27-yard field goal, 2:54. Broncos 34–32. **Drive: 11 plays, 61 yards, 6:03.**
- DEN – Ja'Quan McMillian 46-yard interception return (Wil Lutz kick), 1:48. Broncos 41–32.

**Top passers**

- CLE – Jameis Winston – 34/58, 497 yards, 4 TD, 3 INT
- DEN – Bo Nix – 18/35, 294 yards, TD, 2 INT

**Top rushers**

- CLE – Jerome Ford – 9 rushes, 41 yards
- DEN – Jaleel McLaughlin – 14 rushes, 84 yards

**Top receivers**

- CLE – Jerry Jeudy – 9 receptions, 235 yards, TD
- DEN – Marvin Mims – 3 receptions, 105 yards, TD

The Broncos hosted the Browns in their first Monday night home game since 2020. A 2-yard touchdown run by running back Javonte Williams gave the Broncos the early lead. The Browns responded, with quarterback Jameis Winston connecting on an 8-yard touchdown pass to tight end David Njoku. After an interception of Broncos' quarterback Bo Nix, the Browns took the lead, with a 45-yard field goal by placekicker Dustin Hopkins, who missed a 47-yard attempt in the first quarter. The Broncos reclaimed the lead, with a 1-yard touchdown run by fullback Michael Burton. On the Browns' next possession, Winston was intercepted by Broncos' linebacker Nik Bonitto, who returned the football 70 yards for a touchdown just after the two-minute warning. Winston redeemed himself, and engineered an 11-play, 70-yard drive, culminating in his second touchdown pass to Njoku—a 4-yarder just before halftime.

After an exchange of punts to start the second half, the Broncos extended their lead to 28–17, with Nix launching a 93-yard touchdown pass to wide receiver Marvin Mims. However, on the Browns' first play from scrimmage, Winston connected with wide receiver Jerry Jeudy on a 70-yard touchdown pass, coupled with a successful two-point conversion to Jeudy, to narrow the Broncos' lead to 28–25. This was Jeudy's first game against the Broncos since being traded to the Browns after the 2023 season. A 36-yard field goal by placekicker Wil Lutz extended the Broncos' lead to 31–25 late in the third quarter. After another interception of Nix, the Browns reclaimed the lead, with Winston's fourth touchdown pass of the game—a 5-yarder to running back Nick Chubb with nine minutes remaining in the game. Trailing 32–31, the Broncos marched down the field, but settled for a 27–yard field goal by Lutz with three minutes remaining in the game. The Broncos were hoping for a defensive stop, after struggling to stop Winston the entire game. On the first play after the two-minute warning, Winston was intercepted by Broncos' cornerback Ja'Quan McMillian, who ran 44 yards down the sideline for a touchdown, after not being touched by the Browns' intended receiver, Elijah Moore. The Browns attempted a rally, and with a 1st-and-goal at the 2-yard line, Winston was intercepted in the end zone by Broncos' linebacker Cody Barton to seal the win for the Broncos.

==== Week 15: vs. Indianapolis Colts ====
Week 15: Indianapolis Colts at Denver Broncos – Game summary

Quarter	1	2	3	4	Total
Colts	7	6	0	0	**13**
**Broncos**	0	7	3	21	**31**

at Empower Field at Mile High, Denver, Colorado

- Date: December 15
- Game time: 2:25 p.m. MST
- Game weather: Sunny, 55 °F (13 °C)
- Game attendance: 76,496
- Referee: Carl Cheffers
- TV announcers (CBS): Spero Dedes, Adam Archuleta and Aditi Kinkhabwala
- Recap, Game Book

Game information

**First quarter**

- IND – Anthony Richardson 23-yard run (Matt Gay kick), 10:52. Colts 7–0. **Drive: 10 plays, 70 yards, 4:08.**

**Second quarter**

- IND – Matt Gay 37-yard field goal, 14:49. Colts 10–0. **Drive: 14 plays, 52 yards, 7:17.**
- DEN – Adam Trautman 13-yard pass from Bo Nix (Wil Lutz kick), 5:29. Colts 10–7. **Drive: 9 plays, 54 yards, 4:31.**
- IND – Matt Gay 49-yard field goal, 0:06. Colts 13–7. **Drive: 6 plays, 15 yards, 1:32.**

**Third quarter**

- DEN – Wil Lutz 44-yard field goal, 5:18. Colts 13–10. **Drive: 4 plays, 5 yards, 1:56.**

**Fourth quarter**

- DEN – Nate Adkins 15-yard pass from Bo Nix (Wil Lutz kick), 13:51. Broncos 17–13. **Drive: 2 plays, 15 yards, 0:10.**
- DEN – Nik Bonitto 50-yard fumble return (Wil Lutz kick), 12:29. Broncos 24–13.
- DEN – Courtland Sutton 20-yard pass from Bo Nix (Wil Lutz kick), 5:48. Broncos 31–13. **Drive: 6 plays, 35 yards, 1:51.**

**Top passers**

- IND – Anthony Richardson – 17/38, 172 yards, 2 INT
- DEN – Bo Nix – 20/33, 130 yards, 3 TD, 3 INT

**Top rushers**

- IND – Jonathan Taylor – 22 rushes, 107 yards
- DEN – Bo Nix – 8 rushes, 23 yards

**Top receivers**

- IND – Michael Pittman Jr. – 6 receptions, 58 yards
- DEN – Courtland Sutton – 3 receptions, 32 yards, TD

The Colts took a 10–0 lead, with quarterback Anthony Richardson scrambling for a 23–yard touchdown, followed by a 37-yard field goal by placekicker Matt Gay early in the second quarter; the latter scoring play occurred after an interception of Broncos' quarterback Bo Nix. A 13-yard touchdown pass from Nix to tight end Adam Trautman got the Broncos on the scoreboard. A 49-yard field goal by Gay increased the Colts' lead to 13–7 just before halftime. After Nix threw another interception, the Broncos were in danger of falling two scores behind. Colts' running back Jonathan Taylor rushed down the right sideline for what was initially ruled as a 41-yard touchdown. However, the Broncos caught a major break, when instant replay revealed that Taylor prematurely celebrated and fumbled the football just before breaking the plane of the goal line, resulting in a fumble out the end zone for a touchback. After an exchange of punts, Nix threw this third interception of the game. However, the Broncos caught another break, when safety P. J. Locke forced a fumble off Colts' wide receiver Michael Pittman Jr. on the very next play.

The Broncos' defense the Colts scoreless for the remainder of the game, and the Broncos scored 24 unanswered points. Three plays after the aforementioned Pittman fumble, a 44-yard field goal by placekicker Wil Lutz pulled the Broncos to within a 13–10 deficit at the 5:22 mark of the third quarter. The Broncos then took the lead for good early in the fourth quarter, after Nix connected with tight end Nate Adkins on a 15-yard touchdown pass. Three plays later, a trick play attempt by Richardson and Colts' wide receiver Adonai Mitchell went awry, when Mitchell threw a lateral pass intended for Richardson that was intercepted by Broncos' linebacker Nik Bonitto, who recovered the fumble for a 50-yard touchdown. Nix later connected with wide receiver Courtland Sutton on a 20-yard touchdown pass to put the game out of reach. With the win, the Broncos earned their first winning season wince 2016.

==== Week 16: at Los Angeles Chargers ====
Week 16: Denver Broncos at Los Angeles Chargers – Game summary

Quarter	1	2	3	4	Total
Broncos	7	14	3	3	**27**
**Chargers**	7	6	6	15	**34**

at SoFi Stadium, Inglewood, California

- Date: December 19
- Game time: 6:15 p.m. MST/5:15 p.m. PST
- Game weather: Clear, 64 °F (18 °C) (fixed roof)
- Game attendance: 70,240
- Referee: Clay Martin
- TV announcers (KMGH/Prime Video): Al Michaels, Kirk Herbstreit and Kaylee Hartung
- Recap, Game Book

Game information

**First quarter**

- DEN – Audric Estimé 3-yard run (Wil Lutz kick), 7:34. Broncos 7–0. **Drive: 10 plays, 72 yards, 5:56.**
- LAC – Gus Edwards 1-yard run (Cameron Dicker kick), 3:09. Tied 7–7. **Drive: 8 plays, 70 yards, 4:25.**

**Second quarter**

- DEN – Michael Burton 1-yard pass from Bo Nix (Wil Lutz kick), 12:17. Broncos 14–7. **Drive: 12 plays, 70 yards, 5:52.**
- LAC – Cameron Dicker 37-yard field goal, 8:50. Broncos 14–10. **Drive: 8 plays, 51 yards, 3:27.**
- DEN – Devaughn Vele 6-yard pass from Bo Nix (Wil Lutz kick), 6:22. Broncos 21–10. **Drive: 6 plays, 70 yards, 2:28.**
- LAC – Cameron Dicker 57-yard field goal, 0:00. Broncos 21–13. **Drive: 1 play, 0 yards, 0:00.**

**Third quarter**

- DEN – Wil Lutz 41-yard field goal, 8:31. Broncos 24–13. **Drive: 11 plays, 47 yards, 6:29.**
- LAC – Gus Edwards 5-yard run (run failed), 2:58. Broncos 24–19. **Drive: 10 plays, 70 yards, 5:33.**

**Fourth quarter**

- LAC – Derius Davis 19-yard pass from Justin Herbert (Justin Herbert–Joshua Palmer pass), 12:23. Chargers 27–24. **Drive: 7 plays, 78 yards, 3:22.**
- LAC – Hassan Haskins 34-yard pass from Justin Herbert (Cameron Dicker kick), 2:27. Chargers 34–24. **Drive: 6 plays, 90 yards, 2:01.**
- DEN – Wil Lutz 55-yard field goal, 0:57. Chargers 34–27. **Drive: 7 plays, 33 yards, 1:30.**

**Top passers**

- DEN – Bo Nix – 29/40, 263 yards, 2 TD
- LAC – Justin Herbert – 23/30, 284 yards, 2 TD, INT

**Top rushers**

- DEN – Audric Estimé – 9 rushes, 48 yards, TD
- LAC – Gus Edwards – 14 rushes, 68 yards, 2 TD

**Top receivers**

- DEN – Marvin Mims – 3 receptions, 62 yards
- LAC – Ladd McConkey – 6 receptions, 87 yards

The Broncos got off to a strong start, scoring three touchdowns—all on their first three drives of the game. Quarterback Bo Nix threw two touchdown passes—one apiece to fullback Michael Burton and wide receiver Devaughn Vele, and running back Audric Estimé rushed for another. The Broncos took a 21–10 over the Chargers near the end of the first half. After forcing an interception off Chargers' quarterback Justin Herbert, the Broncos committed a special teams blunder that enabled the Chargers to narrow the Broncos' lead to 21–13 at halftime. Chargers' placekicker Cameron Dicker attempted and made a 57-yard field goal on a rare fair catch kick, following a 15-yard fair catch interference penalty on Broncos' cornerback Tremon Smith with 0:00 on the clock.

A 41-yard field goal by placekicker Wil Lutz increased the Broncos' lead to 24–13 midway through the third quarter. However, the Broncos' offense sputtered in the second half, and the Chargers reeled off 21 unanswered points. First, Chargers' running back Gus Edwards rushed for a 5-yard touchdown, with an unsuccessful two-point attempt. It was Edwards' second rushing touchdown, following a 1-yarder late in the first quarter. Then, after the Broncos went three-and-out, the Chargers took the lead, with Herbert connected with wide receiver Derius Davis on a 19-yard touchdown pass, with a successful two-point conversion, early in the fourth quarter. After an exchange of punts, the Chargers added to their lead, with Herbert's second touchdown pass of the quarter—a 34-yarder to running back Hassan Haskins—with 2:36 remaining in the game. Trailing 34–24, Lutz kicked a 55-yard field goal with only one minute remaining in the game. However, the onside kick attempt was unsuccessful, and the Chargers ran out the clock. With the loss, the Broncos suffered their first sweep to the Chargers since 2010.

==== Week 17: at Cincinnati Bengals ====
Week 17: Denver Broncos at Cincinnati Bengals – Game summary

Quarter	1	2	3	4	OT	Total
Broncos	3	0	7	14	0	**24**
**Bengals**	0	7	3	14	6	**30**

at Paycor Stadium, Cincinnati, Ohio

- Date: December 28
- Game time: 4:30 p.m. EST/2:30 p.m. MST
- Game weather: Cloudy, 60 °F (16 °C)
- Game attendance: 66,546
- Referee: Adrian Hill
- TV announcers (KMGH/NFLN): Kevin Harlan, Trent Green and Melanie Collins
- Recap, Game Book

Game information

**First quarter**

- DEN – Wil Lutz 30-yard field goal, 9:45. Broncos 3–0. **Drive: 10 plays, 58 yards, 5:15.**

**Second quarter**

- CIN – Tee Higgins 2-yard pass from Joe Burrow (Cade York kick), 1:49. Bengals 7–3. **Drive: 7 plays, 62 yards, 3:06.**

**Third quarter**

- CIN – Cade York 22-yard field goal, 9:07. Bengals 10–3. **Drive: 11 plays, 69 yards, 5:53.**
- DEN – Courtland Sutton 6-yard pass from Bo Nix (Wil Lutz kick), 3:10. Tied 10–10. **Drive: 12 plays, 70 yards, 5:57.**

**Fourth quarter**

- CIN – Tee Higgins 12-yard pass from Joe Burrow (Cade York kick), 11:33. Bengals 17–10. **Drive: 11 plays, 63 yards, 6:37.**
- DEN – Marvin Mims 51-yard pass from Bo Nix (Wil Lutz kick), 8:48. Tied 17–17. **Drive: 5 plays, 75 yards, 2:45.**
- CIN – Joe Burrow 1-yard run (Cade York kick), 1:29. Bengals 24–17. **Drive: 6 plays, 59 yards, 1:01.**
- DEN – Marvin Mims 25-yard pass from Bo Nix (Wil Lutz kick), 0:08. Tied 24–24. **Drive: 7 plays, 70 yards, 1:21.**

**Overtime**

- CIN – Tee Higgins 3-yard pass from Joe Burrow, 1:07. Bengals 30–24. **Drive: 5 plays, 63 yards, 1:13.**

**Top passers**

- DEN – Bo Nix – 24/31, 219 yards, 3 TD, INT
- CIN – Joe Burrow – 39/49, 412 yards, 3 TD

**Top rushers**

- DEN – Jaleel McLaughlin – 10 rushes, 69 yards
- CIN – Chase Brown – 20 rushes, 67 yards

**Top receivers**

- DEN – Marvin Mims – 8 receptions, 103 yards, 2 TD
- CIN – Tee Higgins – 11 receptions, 131 yards, 3 TD

A 30-yard field goal by placekicker Wil Lutz gave the Broncos the early lead over the Bengals. Offensively, the Broncos were forced to punt on their next two possessions, and the defense forced two Bengals' turnovers on downs. The Bengals took the lead just after the two-minute warning, with a short 2-yard touchdown pass from quarterback Joe Burrow to wide receiver Tee Higgins. The Broncos failed to get into field goal range just before halftime, and the Bengals added to their lead on the initial possession of the second half, with a 22-yard field goal by placekicker Cade York. After struggling offensively throughout the first half, the Broncos finally reached the end zone, with a 6-yard touchdown pass from quarterback Bo Nix to wide receiver Courtland Sutton to tie the game at 10–10. The Bengals responded early in the fourth quarter, with Burrow's second touchdown pass to Higgins—from 12 yards out. Five plays later, Nix launched a 51-yard to wide receiver Marvin Mims to tie the game at 17–17 midway through the fourth quarter.

On the Bengals' next possession, Broncos' cornerback Patrick Surtain II recovered a fumble off Higgins at the Broncos' 40-yard line. However, as the Broncos were hoping to take the lead, Nix was intercepted by linebacker Germaine Pratt six plays later, giving the Bengals the football at their own 41-yard line with 2:38 remaining in the game. The Bengals reached the Broncos' 6-yard line in three plays at the 1:39 mark of the fourth quarter. However, instead on running out the clock for a potential game-winning field goal, Burrow rushed for a 1-yard touchdown to give the Bengals a 24–17 lead. The Broncos began their final possession of regulation with 1:29 left. Nix led the Broncos down the field, and with only 14 seconds remaining, Nix connected with Mims for a 25-yard touchdown pass that was reviewed by instant replay, but upheld, sending the game to overtime. The Broncos' defense forced a Bengals' punt on the initial possession of overtime. However, the Broncos went three-and-out, and the Bengals marched down the field, culminating in the game-winning 3-yard touchdown pass from Burrow to Higgins at the 1:10 mark of overtime.

==== Week 18: vs. Kansas City Chiefs ====
Week 18: Kansas City Chiefs at Denver Broncos – Game summary

Quarter	1	2	3	4	Total
Chiefs	0	0	0	0	**0**
**Broncos**	14	10	7	7	**38**

at Empower Field at Mile High, Denver, Colorado

- Date: January 5
- Game time: 2:25 p.m. MST
- Game weather: Sunny and clear, 30 °F (−1 °C)
- Game attendance: 76,489
- Referee: Shawn Hochuli
- TV announcers (CBS): Jim Nantz, Tony Romo and Tracy Wolfson
- Recap, Game Book

Game information

**First quarter**

- DEN – Marvin Mims 32-yard pass from Bo Nix (Wil Lutz kick), 11:55. Broncos 7–0. **Drive: 6 plays, 70 yards, 3:05.**
- DEN – Courtland Sutton 10-yard pass from Bo Nix (Wil Lutz kick), 4:53. Broncos 14–0. **Drive: 10 plays, 85 yards, 5:35.**

**Second quarter**

- DEN – Devaughn Vele 3-yard pass from Bo Nix (Wil Lutz kick), 6:46. Broncos 21–0. **Drive: 18 plays, 89 yards, 11:05.**
- DEN – Wil Lutz 33-yard field goal, 0:03. Broncos 24–0. **Drive: 4 plays, 44 yards, 1:01.**

**Third quarter**

- DEN – Marvin Mims 7-yard pass from Bo Nix (Wil Lutz kick), 2:49. Broncos 31–0. **Drive: 11 plays, 79 yards, 6:15.**

**Fourth quarter**

- DEN – Audric Estimé 1-yard run (Wil Lutz kick), 9:40. Broncos 38–0. **Drive: 10 plays, 51 yards, 5:53.**

**Top passers**

- KC – Carson Wentz – 10/17, 98 yards
- DEN – Bo Nix – 26/29, 321 yards, 4 TD

**Top rushers**

- KC – Carson Steele – 8 rushes, 25 yards
- DEN – Bo Nix – 7 rushes, 47 yards

**Top receivers**

- KC – Nikko Remigio – 2 receptions, 48 yards
- DEN – Courtland Sutton – 5 receptions, 98 yards, TD

With the Chiefs resting most of their starters, including quarterback Patrick Mahomes and tight end Travis Kelce, the Broncos took full advantage, with a 38–0 shutout win. Quarterback Bo Nix threw for four touchdowns, running back Audric Estimé rushed for another, and placekicker Wil Lutz added a field goal. The Broncos sacked Chiefs' backup quarterback Carson Wentz five times, adding to their franchise record for sacks in a single season. It was the Broncos first shutout since a 26–0 win over the New York Jets in 2021. With the win, the Broncos earned their first double-digit winning season and playoff berth since their 2015 Super Bowl-winning season.

=== Standings ===
==== Division ====
AFC West
	W	L	T	PCT	DIV	CONF	PF	PA	STK
^{(1)} Kansas City Chiefs	15	2	0	.882	5–1	10–2	385	326	L1
^{(5)} Los Angeles Chargers	11	6	0	.647	4–2	8–4	402	301	W3
^{(7)} Denver Broncos	10	7	0	.588	3–3	6–6	425	311	W1
Las Vegas Raiders	4	13	0	.235	0–6	3–9	309	434	L1

==== Conference ====
AFC
Seed	Team	Division	W	L	T	PCT	DIV	CONF	SOS	SOV	STK
**Division leaders**
1	Kansas City Chiefs	West	15	2	0	.882	5–1	10–2	.488	.463	L1
2	Buffalo Bills	East	13	4	0	.765	5–1	9–3	.467	.448	L1
3	Baltimore Ravens	North	12	5	0	.706	4–2	8–4	.529	.525	W4
4	Houston Texans	South	10	7	0	.588	5–1	8–4	.481	.376	W1
**Wild cards**
5	Los Angeles Chargers	West	11	6	0	.647	4–2	8–4	.467	.348	W3
6 (Note: Pittsburgh clinched the #6 seed over Denver based on head-to-head victory.)	Pittsburgh Steelers	North	10	7	0	.588	3–3	7–5	.502	.453	L4
7	Denver Broncos	West	10	7	0	.588	3–3	6–6	.502	.394	W1
**Did not qualify for the postseason**
8	Cincinnati Bengals	North	9	8	0	.529	3–3	6–6	.478	.314	W5
9 (Note: Indianapolis finished ahead of Miami based on head-to-head victory.)	Indianapolis Colts	South	8	9	0	.471	3–3	7–5	.457	.309	W1
10	Miami Dolphins	East	8	9	0	.471	3–3	6–6	.419	.294	L1
11	New York Jets	East	5	12	0	.294	2–4	5–7	.495	.341	W1
12 (Note: Jacksonville finished ahead of New England and Las Vegas based on conference record. (Jacksonville 4–8 to New England 3–9 to Las Vegas 3–9))	Jacksonville Jaguars	South	4	13	0	.235	3–3	4–8	.478	.265	L1
13 (Note: New England finished ahead of Las Vegas based on strength of victory. (New England .471 to Las Vegas .353))	New England Patriots	East	4	13	0	.235	2–4	3–9	.471	.471	W1
14	Las Vegas Raiders	West	4	13	0	.235	0–6	3–9	.540	.353	L1
15 (Note: Cleveland finished ahead of Tennessee based on strength of victory. (Cleveland .510 to Tennessee .431))	Cleveland Browns	North	3	14	0	.176	2–4	3–9	.536	.510	L6
16	Tennessee Titans	South	3	14	0	.176	1–5	3–9	.522	.431	L6
**Tiebreakers** (Note: When breaking ties for three or more teams under the NFL's rules, they are first broken within divisions, then comparing only the highest ranked remaining team from each division.)

=== Statistics ===
==== Team leaders ====
Category	Player(s)	Value
Passing yards	Bo Nix	3,775
Passing touchdowns	Bo Nix	29
Rushing yards	Javonte Williams	513
Rushing touchdowns	Bo Nix; Javonte Williams	4
Receptions	Courtland Sutton	81
Receiving yards	Courtland Sutton	1,081
Receiving touchdowns	Courtland Sutton	8
Points	Wil Lutz	139
Kickoff return yards	Marvin Mims	194
Punt return yards	Marvin Mims	408
Tackles	Brandon Jones	115
Sacks	Nik Bonitto	13.5
Forced fumbles	Nik Bonitto	2
Interceptions	Patrick Surtain II	4

Source for this section: Denver Broncos' official website.

==== League rankings ====
Offense
Category	Value	NFL rank (out of 32)
Total yards	324.6 YPG	19th
Yards per play	5.2	T–18th
Rushing yards	112.2 YPG	16th
Yards per rush	4.1	T–20th
Passing yards	212.4 YPG	20th
Yards per pass	6.7	T–23rd
Pass completions	379/570 (.665)	11th
Total touchdowns	47	T–9th
Rushing touchdowns	12	T–23rd
Receiving touchdowns	30	T–7th
Scoring	25.0 PPG	10th
Red Zone Touchdowns	35/56 (.625)	7th
Third down efficiency	91/230 (.396)	13th
Fourth down efficiency	15/22 (.682)	5th
First downs per game	18.5	T–20th
Fewest sacks allowed	24	T–3rd
Fewest giveaways	19	T–11th
Fewest penalties	108	T–13th
Least penalty yardage	941	23rd

Defense
Category	Value	NFL rank (out of 32)
Total yards	317.1 YPG	7th
Yards per play	4.9	2nd
Rushing yards	96.4 YPG	3rd
Yards per rush	3.9	2nd
Passing yards	220.7 YPG	19th
Yards per pass	6.8	T–5th
Pass completions	393/606 (.649)	T–11th
Total touchdowns	32	2nd
Rushing touchdowns	10	3rd
Receiving touchdowns	22	T–6th
Scoring	18.3 PPG	3rd
Red Zone Touchdowns	23/49 (.469)	3rd
Third down efficiency	88/236 (.373)	11th
Fourth down efficiency	16/30 (.533)	14th
First downs per game	19.2	T–11th
Sacks	63	1st
Takeaways	25	T–7th
Fewest penalties	101	T–8th
Least penalty yardage	723	3rd

Special teams
Category	Value	NFL rank (out of 32)
Gross punting	46.7 YPP	T–19th
Net punting	42.0 YPP	9th
Kickoffs	63.4 YPK	T–13th
Punt returns	15.7 YPR	1st
Kick returns	28.0 YPR	T–15th
Punt coverage	8.7 YPR	10th
Kick coverage	27.5	T–15th

Source for this section: Pro-Football Reference.

=== Starters ===
Position	Player	Age	Years pro	Starts
Offense
QB	Bo Nix	24	Rookie	17
RB	Javonte Williams	24	3	11
WR	Courtland Sutton	29	6	13
WR	Lil'Jordan Humphrey	26	5	7
TE	Adam Trautman	27	4	14
TE	Nate Adkins	25	1	10
LT	Garett Bolles	32	7	17
LG	Ben Powers	28	5	17
C	Luke Wattenberg	27	2	13
RG	Quinn Meinerz	26	3	17
RT	Mike McGlinchey	30	6	13
Defense
LDE	Zach Allen	27	5	16
NT	D. J. Jones	29	7	17
RDE	John Franklin-Myers	28	6	16
LOLB	Jonathon Cooper	26	3	17
LILB	Cody Barton	28	5	14
RILB	Justin Strnad	28	3	8
ROLB	Nik Bonitto	25	2	15
LCB	Patrick Surtain II	24	3	16
SS	P. J. Locke	27	4	15
FS	Brandon Jones	26	4	15
RCB	Riley Moss	24	1	14

Source for this section: Pro-Football Reference.

=== Captains ===
Position	Player	Times captain
Offense
QB	Bo Nix	1
WR	Courtland Sutton	4
G	Quinn Meinerz	1
Defense
ILB	Alex Singleton	2
CB	Patrick Surtain II	1
Special Teams
K	Wil Lutz	1

Source for this section: Denver Broncos.

== Postseason ==
=== Schedule ===
Round	Date	Opponent (seed)	Result	Record	Venue	Recap
Wild Card	January 12	at Buffalo Bills (2)	L 7–31	0–1	Highmark Stadium	Recap

=== Game summaries ===
==== AFC Wild Card Playoffs: at (2) Buffalo Bills ====
AFC Wild Card Playoffs: (7) Denver Broncos at (2) Buffalo Bills – Game summary

Quarter	1	2	3	4	Total
Broncos	7	0	0	0	7
Bills	3	7	11	10	31

at Highmark Stadium, Orchard Park, New York

- Date: January 12, 2025
- Game time: 1:00 p.m. EST/11:00 a.m. MST
- Game weather: Cloudy, 32 °F (0 °C)
- Game attendance: 70,332
- Referee: Bill Vinovich
- TV announcers (CBS): Jim Nantz, Tony Romo, Tracy Wolfson and Jay Feely
- Recap, Game Book

Game information

First quarter

- DEN – Troy Franklin 43-yard pass from Bo Nix (Wil Lutz kick), 12:36. Broncos 7–0. Drive: 5 plays, 70 yards, 2:24.
- BUF – Tyler Bass 26-yard field goal, 7:07. Broncos 7–3. Drive: 12 plays, 59 yards, 5:29.

Second quarter

- BUF – James Cook 5-yard run (Tyler Bass kick), 12:57. Bills 10–7. Drive: 13 plays, 81 yards, 7:35.

Third quarter

- BUF – Tyler Bass 27-yard field goal, 10:03. Bills 13–7. Drive: 8 plays, 55 yards, 4:57.
- BUF – Ty Johnson 24-yard pass from Josh Allen (Josh Allen–Keon Coleman pass), 3:06. Bills 21–7. Drive: 9 plays, 73 yards, 5:34.

Fourth quarter

- BUF – Curtis Samuel 55-yard pass from Josh Allen (Tyler Bass kick), 14:49. Bills 28–7. Drive: 3 plays, 59 yards, 1:17.
- BUF – Tyler Bass 34-yard field goal, 4:37. Bills 31–7. Drive: 14 plays, 70 yards, 6:55.

Top passers

- DEN – Bo Nix – 13/22, 144 yards, TD
- BUF – Josh Allen – 20/26, 272 yards, 2 TD

Top rushers

- DEN – Bo Nix – 4 rushes, 43 yards
- BUF – James Cook – 23 rushes, 120 yards, TD

Top receivers

- DEN – Courtland Sutton – 5 receptions, 75 yards
- BUF – Curtis Samuel – 3 receptions, 68 yards, TD

In their first playoff game since Super Bowl 50, the Broncos started out strong on the game's opening possession, with quarterback Bo Nix launching a 43-yard touchdown pass to wide receiver Troy Franklin. However, this was the Broncos' only scoring play, as they allowed the Bills to score the game's final 31 points, rush for 210 yards and control the time of possession by more than a 2-to-1 margin. The Broncos only trailed 10–7, after placekicker Wil Lutz hit the right upright on a 50-yard field goal attempt in the final seconds of the first half. The Bills, however, dominated the second half. Quarterback Josh Allen threw two touchdown passes, running back James Cook rushed for another touchdown and placekicker Tyler Bass kicked three field goals.

== Awards and honors ==
Recipient	Award(s)
Cody Barton	Week 7: AFC Defensive Player of the Week
Wil Lutz	Week 3: AFC Special Teams Player of the Week; Week 12: AFC Special Teams Player of the Week
Marvin Mims	Week 15: AFC Special Teams Player of the Week
Bo Nix	October: NFL Offensive Rookie of the Month; Week 10: NFL Rookie of the Week; Week 11: AFC Offensive Player of the Week; Week 11: FedEx Air & Ground Player of the Week; Week 11: NFL Rookie of the Week; Week 12: NFL Rookie of the Week; Week 18: AFC Offensive Player of the Week; Week 18: FedEx Air & Ground Player of the Week
Patrick Surtain II	Week 5: AFC Defensive Player of the Week; November: AFC Defensive Player of the Month; 2024: PFWA Defensive Player of the Year; 2024: AP NFL Defensive Player of the Year

=== Pro Bowl and All-Pro selections ===
On January 2, 2025, linebacker Nik Bonitto, return specialist Marvin Mims and cornerback Patrick Surtain II were named starters for the 2025 Pro Bowl Games. The following players were names as alternates: guard Quinn Meinerz (first alternate), long snapper Mitchell Fraboni (first alternate), placekicker Wil Lutz (third alternate), tackle Garett Bolles (third alternate), fullback Michael Burton (fourth alternate), defensive end Zach Allen (fourth alternate), quarterback Bo Nix (fourth alternate) and safety Brandon Jones (fifth alternate). Meinerz and Nix were later invited to the Pro Bowl as replacements, but both declined. On January 8, Mims and Surtain were selected to the third annual NFLPA Players' All-Pro team. Two days later (January 10), the Associate Press All-Pro teams were announced, with Meinerz, Mims and Surtain awarded first-team nods, while Allen and Bonitto were awarded second-team nods. The Broncos has the most selections to the PFWA All-NFL team, with four: Bonitto, Meinerz, Mims and Surtain. Additionally, linebacker Jonah Elliss was selected to the PFWA NFL All-Rookie Team.
