= Ja'Quan McMillian =

American football player (born 2000)

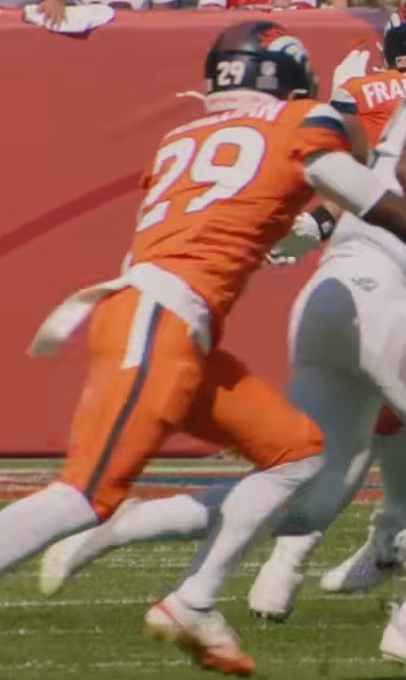
- McMillian with the Denver Broncos in 2025

No. 29 – Denver Broncos
- Position: Cornerback
- Roster status: Active

Personal information
- Born: June 4, 2000 (age 26); Winston-Salem, North Carolina, U.S.
- Listed height: 5 ft 10 in (1.78 m)
- Listed weight: 183 lb (83 kg)

Career information
- High school: West Forsyth (Winston-Salem)
- College: East Carolina (2019–2021)
- NFL draft: 2022: undrafted

Career history
- Denver Broncos (2022–present)

Awards and highlights
- Second-team All-American (2021); 2× Second-team All-AAC (2020, 2021)

Career NFL statistics as of 2025
- Total tackles: 195
- Sacks: 7
- Forced fumbles: 5
- Fumble recoveries: 2
- Pass deflections: 24
- Interceptions: 6
- Defensive touchdowns: 2
- Stats at Pro Football Reference

Ja'Quan McMillian (/mækˈmɪlən/ mak-MIH-lən; born June 4, 2000) is an American professional football cornerback for the Denver Broncos of the National Football League (NFL). He played college football for the East Carolina Pirates and was signed by the Broncos as an undrafted free agent in 2022.

== College career ==
McMillian was a semi-finalist for the Jim Thorpe Award and earned second-team All-American honors for his 2021 season. He also earned second-team all-American Athletic Conference honors for his 2020 and 2021 seasons.

== Professional career ==
Pre-draft measurables
Height	Weight	Arm length	Hand span	Wingspan	40-yard dash	10-yard split	20-yard split	20-yard shuttle	Three-cone drill	Vertical jump	Broad jump	Bench press
5 ft 9 3/4 in (1.77 m)	181 lb (82 kg)	29 in (0.74 m)	8 5/8 in (0.22 m)	5 ft 11 in (1.80 m)	4.59 s	1.67 s	2.69 s	4.25 s	6.76 s	36.5 in (0.93 m)	10 ft 0 in (3.05 m)	14 reps
All values from Pro Day

After going unselected in the 2022 NFL draft, the Denver Broncos signed McMillian as an undrafted free agent. He was waived at the final roster cuts, on August 30, 2022. The Broncos signed him to their practice squad the next day, where he remained until January 3, 2023, when he was elevated to the active roster. McMillian made his professional debut 5 days later as a starter in the Broncos' Week 18 matchup against the Los Angeles Chargers, in which he played every defensive snap.

In his second season, he appeared in 16 games and started three. He finished with two sacks, 51 total tackles (37 solo), two interceptions, five passes defended, two forced fumbles, and two fumble recoveries in the 2023 season. As the season progressed, McMillian became the Broncos' primary nickel corner after Essang Bassey was cut from the team and K'Waun Williams spent the entire season on injured reserve.

In Week 13 of the 2024 season against the Cleveland Browns with less than two minutes remaining in the fourth quarter and the Broncos leading 34–32, McMillian intercepted a pass by Jameis Winston and returned it 44 yards for a touchdown, effectively sealing the game for the Broncos.

On March 4, 2025, the Broncos assigned his exclusive-rights free agent tender, keeping him under contract through the 2025 season. McMillian was instrumental in the Broncos' Week 11 victory against the Kansas City Chiefs, recording an interception and two sacks. With the win the Broncos moved to a record of 9–2 and obtained a two-game lead for first place in the AFC West.

During the Broncos Divisional Round matchup against the Buffalo Bills, McMillian intercepted Josh Allen in overtime, ripping the ball away from Brandin Cooks to give the Broncos the ball. They would end up kicking a game-winning field goal on the subsequent drive, advancing to the AFC Championship.

On February 27, 2026, the Broncos placed a second-round restricted free agent tender on McMillian worth $5.8 million.

== NFL career statistics ==
Legend
**Bold**	Career high

=== Regular season ===
Year	Team	Games		Tackles					Interceptions						Fumbles				
Year	Team	GP	GS	Cmb	Solo	Ast	Sck	TFL	Int	Yds	Avg	Lng	TD	PD	FF	Fmb	FR	Yds	TD
2022	DEN	1	1	7	6	1	0.0	0	0	0	0.0	0	0	0	0	0	0	0	0
2023	DEN	16	3	51	37	14	2.0	**7**	**2**	14	7.0	9	0	5	**2**	0	**2**	**4**	0
2024	DEN	17	9	**81**	**61**	**20**	1.0	4	**2**	44	22.0	44	**1**	**10**	1	0	0	0	0
2025	DEN	17	3	56	40	16	**4.0**	5	**2**	**61**	**30.5**	**45**	**1**	9	**2**	**1**	0	0	0
Career		51	16	195	144	51	7.0	16	6	119	19.8	45	2	24	5	1	2	4	0

=== Postseason ===
Year	Team	Games		Tackles					Interceptions						Fumbles				
Year	Team	GP	GS	Cmb	Solo	Ast	Sck	TFL	Int	Yds	Avg	Lng	TD	PD	FF	Fmb	FR	Yds	TD
2024	DEN	1	1	**4**	**2**	**2**	0.0	0	0	0	0.0	0	0	0	0	0	0	0	0
2025	DEN	2	2	2	1	1	0.0	**1**	**1**	0	0.0	0	0	**1**	0	0	0	0	0
Career		3	3	6	3	3	0.0	1	1	0	0.0	0	0	1	0	0	0	0	0
