= Justin Strnad =

American football player (born 1996)

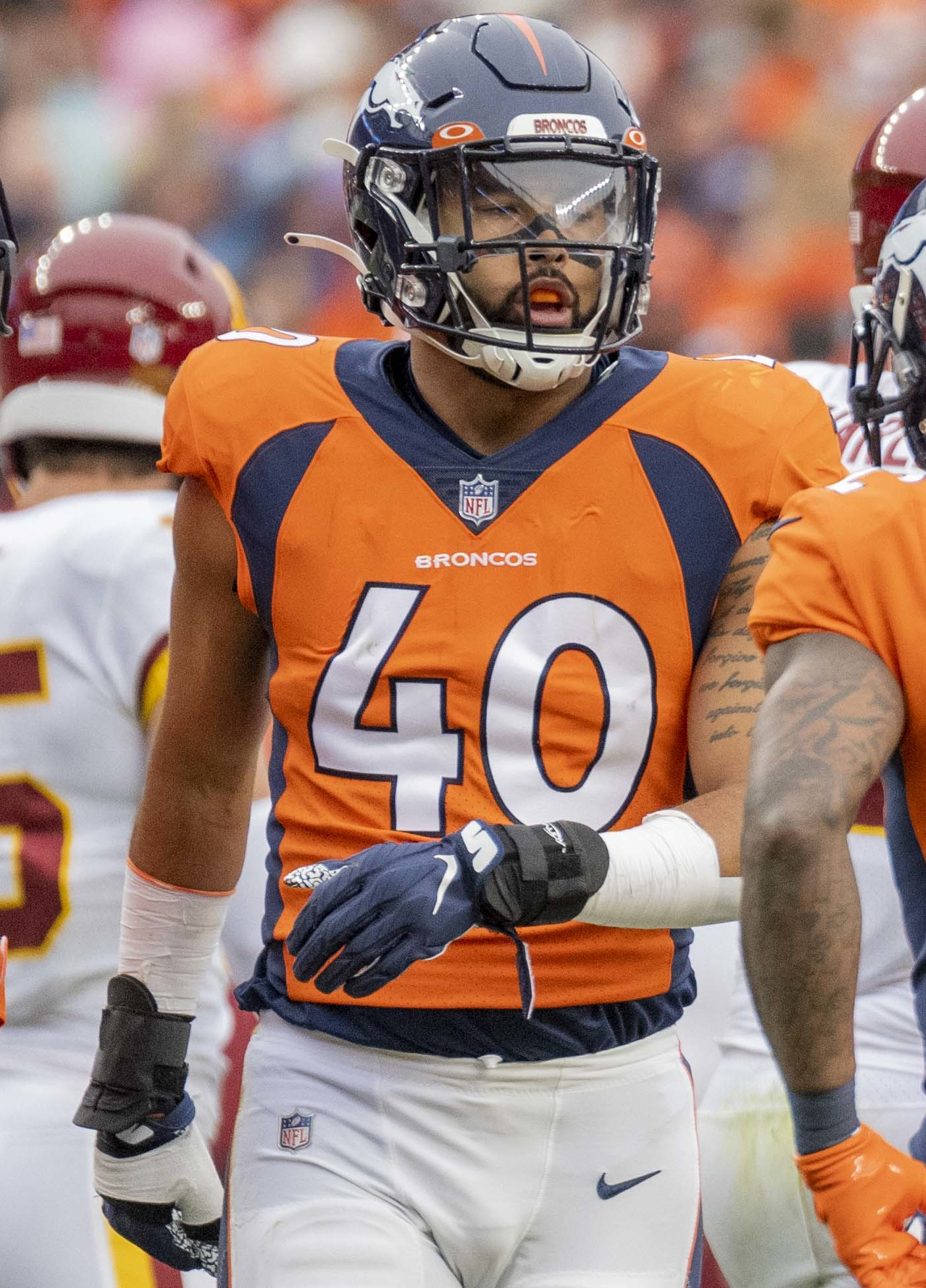
- Strnad with the Denver Broncos in 2021

No. 40 – Denver Broncos
- Position: Inside linebacker
- Roster status: Active

Personal information
- Born: August 21, 1996 (age 30); Palm Harbor, Florida, U.S.
- Listed height: 6 ft 3 in (1.91 m)
- Listed weight: 235 lb (107 kg)

Career information
- High school: East Lake (Tarpon Springs, Florida)
- College: Wake Forest (2015–2019)
- NFL draft: 2020: 5th round, 178th overall pick

Career history
- Denver Broncos (2020–present)

Career NFL statistics as of Week 18, 2025
- Total tackles: 177
- Sacks: 7.5
- Pass deflections: 6
- Interceptions: 1
- Stats at Pro Football Reference

Justin Strnad (/stərˈnɑːd/ stər-NAHD; born August 21, 1996), nicknamed "Garbs", is an American professional football inside linebacker for the Denver Broncos of the National Football League (NFL). He played college football for the Wake Forest Demon Deacons.

== College career ==
After playing high school football at East Lake in Tarpon Springs, Florida, Strnad committed to Wake Forest over Illinois, Iowa State, Marshall, Florida International and others who offered him scholarships. Strnad redshirted his freshman year at Wake Forest but then played in all 13 games his redshirt freshman year. He again played as a reserve linebacker his sophomore year but led the Demon Deacons in special teams tackles and interceptions. He moved up to a starting role as a junior, earning Honorable Mention all-ACC honors. A torn biceps tendon, suffered against Florida State in October, ended his senior season. Strnad registered two sacks and an interception in his shortened senior season; the interception was a key play late for Wake Forest in a 38–35 win over Utah State. He was once again named Honorable Mention all-ACC for 2019. Strnad garnered an invite to the 2020 Senior Bowl, but did not participate due to injury.

== Professional career ==
Pre-draft measurables
Height	Weight	Arm length	Hand span	Wingspan	40-yard dash	10-yard split	20-yard split	20-yard shuttle	Vertical jump	Broad jump
6 ft 3 3/8 in (1.91 m)	238 lb (108 kg)	31 3/4 in (0.81 m)	9 1/8 in (0.23 m)	6 ft 6 in (1.98 m)	4.74 s	1.56 s	2.80 s	4.49 s	29.0 in (0.74 m)	9 ft 5 in (2.87 m)
All values from NFL Combine

Strnad was selected by the Denver Broncos in the fifth round with the 178th overall pick in the 2020 NFL draft. He was placed on injured reserve on August 31, 2020, after undergoing season-ending wrist surgery.

On March 19, 2024, it was reported that Strnad would be signing with the Carolina Panthers. However, hours later, Strnad flipped his commitment and re–signed with the Broncos on a one-year contract.

On March 13, 2025, Strnad signed a one-year, $2.7 million extension with the Broncos.

In Week 7 against the New York Giants, Strnad got his first career interception off of Jaxson Dart while the Broncos were down 26–16, turning the tide of the game and allowing them to achieve a 33–32 fourth quarter comeback victory.

On March 8, 2026, Strnad signed a three-year, $18 million contract extension with the Broncos.

== NFL career statistics ==
Legend
**Bold**	Career high

=== Regular season ===
Year	Team	Games		Tackles					Interceptions						Fumbles				
Year	Team	GP	GS	Cmb	Solo	Ast	Sck	TFL	Int	Yds	Avg	Lng	TD	PD	FF	Fmb	FR	Yds	TD
2021	DEN	16	5	36	23	13	0.0	0	0	0	0.0	0	0	0	0	0	0	0	0
2022	DEN	17	0	5	4	1	0.0	0	0	0	0.0	0	0	0	0	0	0	0	0
2023	DEN	17	0	5	4	1	0.0	0	0	0	0.0	0	0	0	0	0	0	0	0
2024	DEN	17	8	**73**	**48**	25	3.0	**8**	0	0	0.0	0	0	**3**	0	0	0	0	0
2025	DEN	16	8	58	23	**35**	**4.5**	5	**1**	**21**	**21.0**	**21**	0	**3**	0	0	0	0	0
Career		83	21	177	102	75	7.5	13	1	21	21.0	21	0	6	0	0	0	0	0

=== Postseason ===
Year	Team	Games		Tackles					Interceptions						Fumbles				
Year	Team	GP	GS	Cmb	Solo	Ast	Sck	TFL	Int	Yds	Avg	Lng	TD	PD	FF	Fmb	FR	Yds	TD
2024	DEN	1	1	**5**	**4**	1	0.0	0	0	0	0.0	0	0	0	0	0	0	0	0
2025	DEN	2	0	4	1	**3**	0.0	0	0	0	0.0	0	0	0	0	0	0	0	0
Career		3	1	9	5	4	0.0	0	0	0	0.0	0	0	0	0	0	0	0	0
