= George Paton (American football executive) =

Denver Broncos general manager (born 1970)

Denver Broncos
- Title: General manager

Personal information
- Born: May 5, 1970 (age 56); La Cañada Flintridge, California, U.S.

Career information
- Position: Safety
- High school: Loyola (Los Angeles, California)
- College: UCLA (1988–1991)

Career history
- Chicago Bears (1997–2000); Scouting intern (1997); Pro scout (1998–1999); Assistant director of pro personnel (2000); Miami Dolphins (2001–2006) Director of pro personnel; Minnesota Vikings (2007–2020); Director of player personnel (2007–2011); Assistant general manager (2012–2014); Assistant general manager & vice president of player personnel (2015–2020); Denver Broncos (2021–present) General manager
- Executive profile at Pro Football Reference

George Paton (/ˈpeɪtən/ PAY-tən; born May 5, 1970) is an American professional football executive who is the general manager of the Denver Broncos of the National Football League (NFL). Paton previously served as the assistant general manager and vice president of player personnel for the Minnesota Vikings and served with the Vikings in various executive roles for 14 seasons. Paton began his NFL career as a scout for the Chicago Bears before serving as the director of pro personnel for the Miami Dolphins from 2001 to 2006 and joining the Vikings in 2007. Before his career as an executive, Paton played college football at UCLA and later professionally in the Austrian Football League and Italian Football League.

== Early life ==
A native of La Cañada Flintridge, California, Paton played quarterback at Loyola High School (Los Angeles), and was a four-year letter winner at safety for the UCLA Bruins from 1988 to 1991, being a part of a pair of Bruin bowl teams. While at UCLA, Paton earned a bachelor's degree in history.

== Europe ==
In 1992, Paton played in the Italian Football League. In 1993, Paton played in the Austrian Football League with the Vienna Vikings. The team reached the semifinals of the league playoffs.

== Executive career ==
=== Chicago Bears ===
In 1997, Paton began his executive career with the Chicago Bears in their scouting and personnel department, eventually rising up to the position of assistant director of pro personnel in 2000.

=== Miami Dolphins ===
In 2001, Paton was hired by the Miami Dolphins as their director of pro personnel.

=== Minnesota Vikings ===
In 2007, Paton was hired as the director of player personnel for the Minnesota Vikings, reuniting with the Vikings vice president of player personnel, Rick Spielman, who worked with Paton in Miami and Chicago. When Spielman was promoted to the Vikings general manager in 2012, Paton was promoted to be assistant general manager. In 2019, Paton was given an additional role as vice president of player personnel.

=== Denver Broncos ===
On January 12, 2021, Paton was named the general manager of the Denver Broncos.

On May 8, 2026, Paton signed a five-year extension with the Broncos after being credited with constructing the roster that led to their playoff runs in 2024 and 2025 their first playoff appearance and win since their Super Bowl 50 winning season in 2015.

== Personal life ==
The son of a high school football coach, Paton is married to Barbara. They have two children, a daughter, Bella and a son, Beau. He is an avid fan of Lil Wayne.
