= Malcolm Roach =

American football player (born 1998)

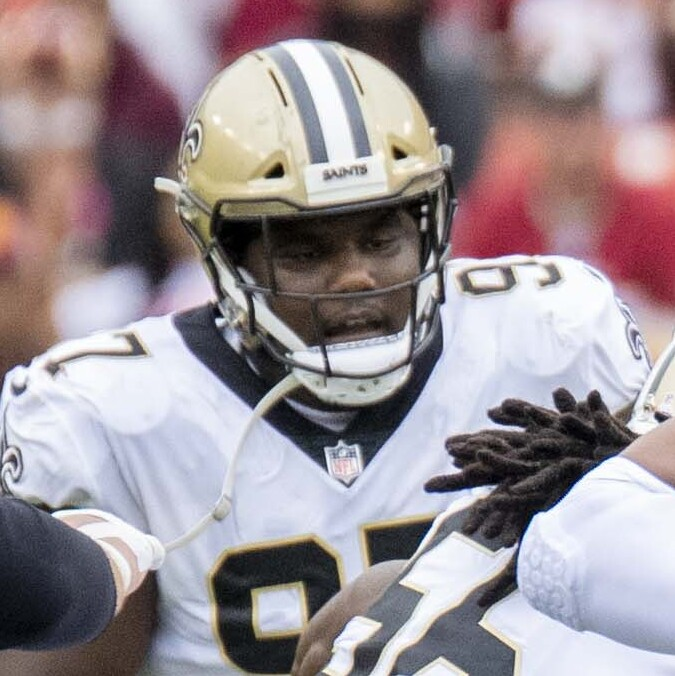
- Roach in 2021

No. 97 – Denver Broncos
- Position: Defensive tackle
- Roster status: Active

Personal information
- Born: June 9, 1998 (age 28); Baton Rouge, Louisiana, U.S.
- Listed height: 6 ft 3 in (1.91 m)
- Listed weight: 290 lb (132 kg)

Career information
- High school: Madison Prep Academy (Baton Rouge)
- College: Texas (2016–2019)
- NFL draft: 2020: undrafted

Career history
- New Orleans Saints (2020–2023); Denver Broncos (2024–present)

Career NFL statistics as of Week 5, 2026
- Total tackles: 190
- Sacks: 8.5
- Forced fumbles: 1
- Fumble recoveries: 1
- Interceptions: 1
- Pass deflections: 9
- Stats at Pro Football Reference

Malcolm Roach (born June 9, 1998) is an American professional football defensive tackle for the Denver Broncos of the National Football League (NFL). He played college football for the Texas Longhorns and was signed by the New Orleans Saints as an undrafted free agent in 2020.

== Early life ==
Malcolm Roach was born to Nancy and Mike Roach in Baton Rouge, Louisiana. He was coached by his father at Madison Prep, where he was four-time all-state selection.

== College career ==
Roach was a member of the Texas Longhorns for four seasons. He finished his collegiate career with 134 tackles, 22.5 tackles for loss, and 8.0 sacks.

== Professional career ==
Pre-draft measurables
Height	Weight	Arm length	Hand span	Wingspan	40-yard dash	10-yard split	20-yard split	Vertical jump	Broad jump	Bench press
6 ft 2 1/8 in (1.88 m)	297 lb (135 kg)	31 7/8 in (0.81 m)	9 5/8 in (0.24 m)	6 ft 5 1/2 in (1.97 m)	4.84 s	1.68 s	2.81 s	30.0 in (0.76 m)	9 ft 6 in (2.90 m)	20 reps
All values from NFL Combine

=== New Orleans Saints ===
Roach was signed by the New Orleans Saints as an undrafted free agent on April 27, 2020. He made the team out of training camp. Roach made his NFL debut on September 13, in the season opener against the Tampa Bay Buccaneers.

On November 20, 2021, Roach was placed on injured reserve. He was released on December 7 and re-signed to the practice squad. Roach signed a reserve/future contract with the Saints on January 12, 2022.

On September 1, 2022, Roach was placed on injured reserve. He was activated on October 8. He did not receive a qualifying offer following the season and became a free agent on March 15, 2023.

Roach re-signed with the Saints on March 22, 2023. He was placed on injured reserve on December 6.

=== Denver Broncos ===
Roach with the Broncos in 2026

On March 14, 2024, Roach signed a two-year contract with the Denver Broncos. He appeared in all 17 of Denver's games (including one start), recording two pass deflections, one forced fumble, one fumble recovery, 2.5 sacks, and 43 combined tackles.

On September 6, 2025, Roach was placed on short-term injured reserve after suffering a grade 2 calf strain in practice ahead of the Broncos' Week 1 season opener against the Tennessee Titans. On October 8, Roach was designated to return from IR, and was activated three days later ahead of the team's Week 6 game against the New York Jets. On November 26, Roach and the Broncos agreed to a three-year, $29.25 million contract extension.

== NFL career statistics ==
Legend
**Bold**	Career high

=== Regular season ===
Year	Team	Games		Tackles					Interceptions						Fumbles				
Year	Team	GP	GS	Cmb	Solo	Ast	Sck	TFL	Int	Yds	Avg	Lng	TD	PD	FF	Fum	FR	Yds	TD
2020	NO	9	0	16	7	9	0.0	2	0	0	0.0	0	0	0	0	0	0	0	0
2021	NO	7	2	10	4	6	0.0	0	**1**	**5**	**5.0**	**5**	0	1	0	0	0	0	0
2022	NO	13	3	26	14	12	1.0	2	0	0	0.0	0	0	0	0	0	0	0	0
2023	NO	12	0	38	13	25	0.0	3	0	0	0.0	0	0	**3**	0	0	0	0	0
2024	DEN	17	1	**43**	**18**	25	2.5	**5**	0	0	0.0	0	0	2	**1**	0	**1**	0	0
2025	DEN	12	2	41	15	**26**	**4.0**	3	0	0	0.0	0	0	0	0	0	0	0	0
Career		70	8	174	71	103	7.5	15	1	5	5.0	5	0	6	1	0	1	0	0

=== Postseason ===
Year	Team	Games		Tackles					Interceptions						Fumbles				
Year	Team	GP	GS	Cmb	Solo	Ast	Sck	TFL	Int	Yds	Avg	Lng	TD	PD	FF	Fum	FR	Yds	TD
2024	DEN	1	0	1	1	0	0.0	0	0	0	0.0	0	0	0	0	0	0	0	0
2025	DEN	2	0	**9**	**6**	**3**	**2.0**	**3**	0	0	0.0	0	0	0	0	0	**1**	0	0
Career		3	0	10	7	3	2.0	3	0	0	0.0	0	0	0	0	0	1	0	0
