= John Franklin-Myers =

American football player (born 1996)

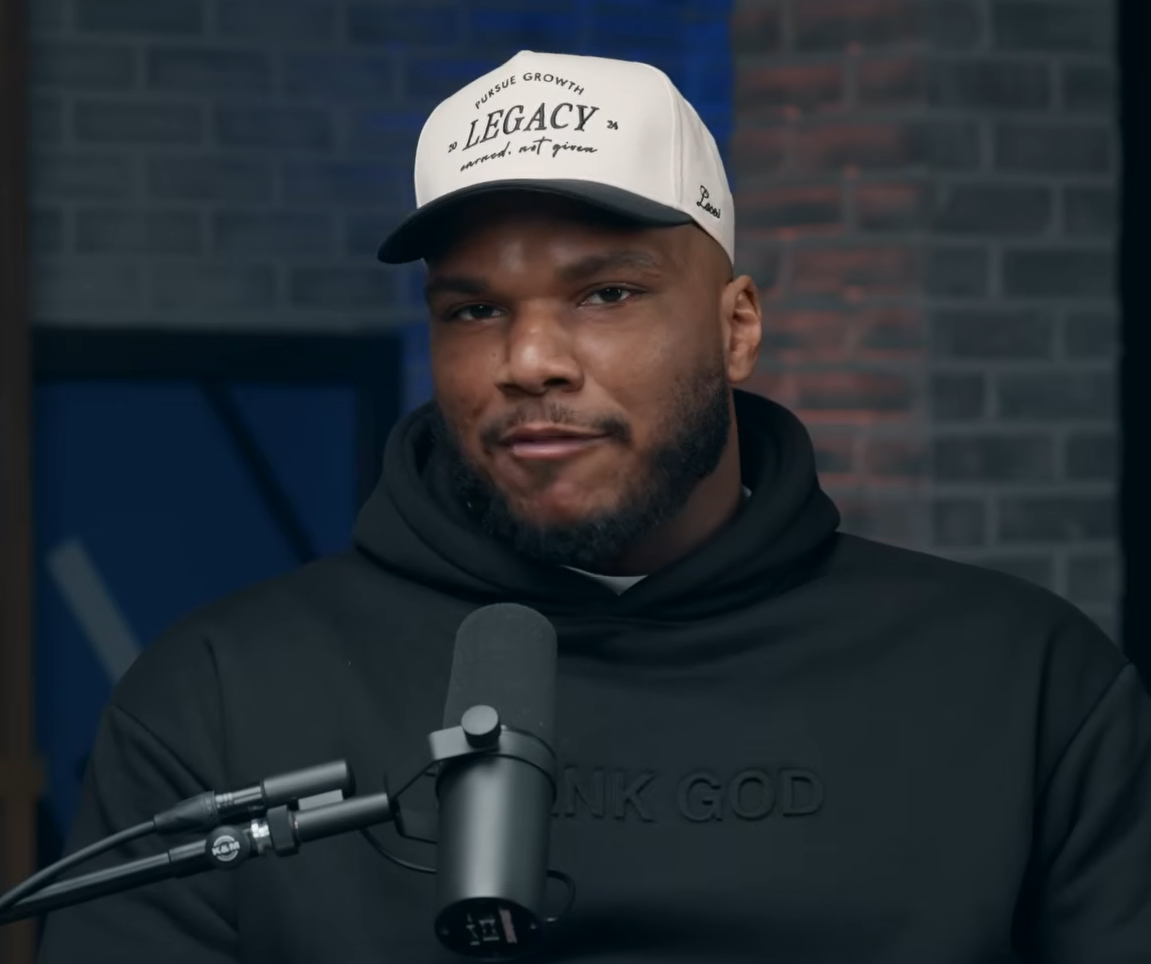
- Franklin-Myers in 2026

No. 91 – Tennessee Titans
- Position: Defensive tackle
- Roster status: Active

Personal information
- Born: September 26, 1996 (age 30); Los Angeles, California, U.S.
- Listed height: 6 ft 4 in (1.93 m)
- Listed weight: 288 lb (131 kg)

Career information
- High school: Greenville (Greenville, Texas)
- College: Stephen F. Austin (2014–2017)
- NFL draft: 2018: 4th round, 135th overall pick

Career history
- Los Angeles Rams (2018); New York Jets (2019–2023); Denver Broncos (2024–2025); Tennessee Titans (2026–present)

Awards and highlights
- First-team All-Southland (2016)

Career NFL statistics as of Week 10, 2026
- Total tackles: 216
- Sacks: 35.5
- Forced fumbles: 2
- Fumble recoveries: 3
- Pass deflections: 8
- Interceptions: 1
- Stats at Pro Football Reference

John Franklin-Myers (born September 26, 1996) is an American professional football defensive tackle for the Tennessee Titans of the National Football League (NFL). He played college football for the Stephen F. Austin Lumberjacks. Franklin-Myers was drafted by the Los Angeles Rams in the fourth round of the 2018 NFL draft. He has also played for the New York Jets and Denver Broncos.

== Early life ==
Franklin-Myers attended and played high school football at Greenville High School in Greenville, Texas.

== College career ==
Franklin-Myers played college football for the Stephen F. Austin Lumberjacks.

== Professional career ==
Pre-draft measurables
Height	Weight	Arm length	Hand span	Wingspan	40-yard dash	10-yard split	20-yard split	20-yard shuttle	Three-cone drill	Vertical jump	Broad jump	Bench press
6 ft 3 7/8 in (1.93 m)	283 lb (128 kg)	32 7/8 in (0.84 m)	10 in (0.25 m)	6 ft 8 3/8 in (2.04 m)	4.75 s	1.66 s	2.78 s	4.48 s	7.36 s	33.0 in (0.84 m)	9 ft 5 in (2.87 m)	26 reps
All values from NFL Combine

=== Los Angeles Rams ===
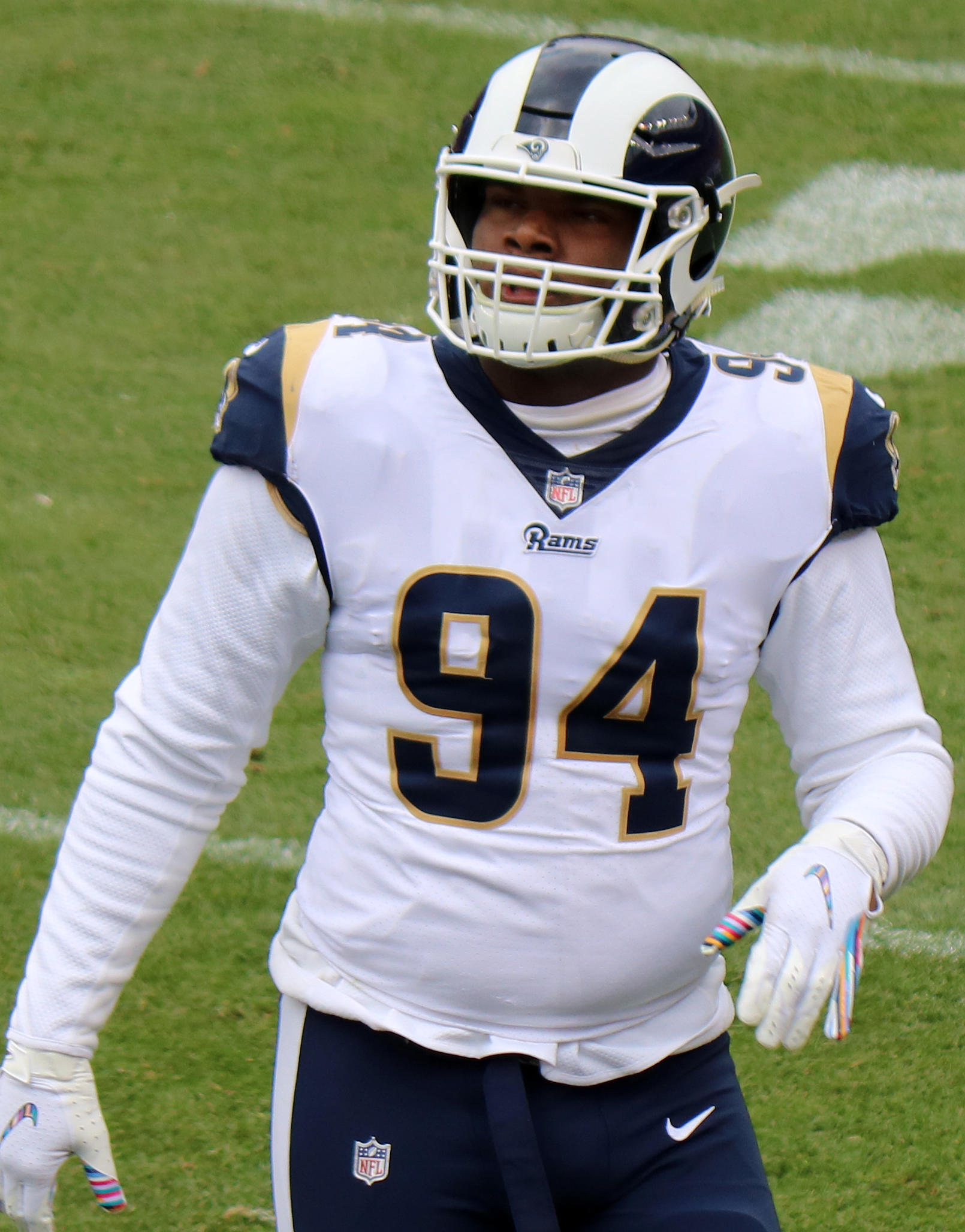
Franklin-Myers with the Los Angeles Rams in 2018

Franklin-Myers was selected by the Los Angeles Rams in the fourth round (135th overall) of the 2018 NFL draft. The pick used to draft him originally was acquired in a trade that sent Alec Ogletree to the New York Giants. He made his professional debut in the Rams' season opener against the Oakland Raiders. In Week 4, against the Minnesota Vikings, he recorded his first professional sack. As a rookie, he appeared in 16 regular season games. He recorded two sacks, ten total tackles, one forced fumble, and one fumble recovery. He also recorded a sack and a fumble in Super Bowl LIII against New England Patriots quarterback Tom Brady, though the fumble was quickly recovered by the Patriots offense.

Franklin-Myers was waived during final roster cuts on August 31, 2019.

=== New York Jets ===
On September 1, 2019, Franklin-Myers was claimed off waivers by the New York Jets. He was placed on injured reserve on October 4, 2019. He was designated for return from injured reserve on November 27, 2019, and began practicing with the team again. However, he was not activated by the end of the three-week practice window on December 18, 2019, and remained on injured reserve for the rest of the season. In the 2020 season, he appeared in 15 games and started two. He finished with three sacks, 19 total tackles (eight solo), two passes defended, and two fumble recoveries.

On October 7, 2021, Franklin-Myers signed a four-year contract extension with the Jets for $55 million, with $30.2 million guaranteed. In the 2021 season, he appeared in and started 16 games. He finished with six sacks, 35 total tackles (17 solo), one interception, one pass defended, and one forced fumble.

In the 2022 season, Franklin-Myers started in all 17 games. He finished with five sacks, 38 total tackles (16 solo), and one pass defended. In the 2023 season, Franklin-Myers started in all 17 games. He finished with 3.5 sacks, 33 total tackles (15 solo), and three passes defended.

=== Denver Broncos ===
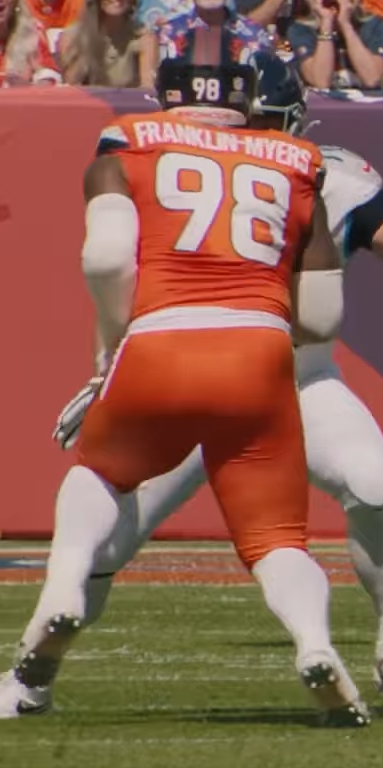
Franklin-Myers with the Denver Broncos in 2025

On April 29, 2024, Franklin-Myers was traded to the Denver Broncos for a 2026 sixth-round pick. In the 2024 season, he finished with a career-high seven sacks and 40 tackles.

In the 2025 season, Franklin-Myers had 7.5 sacks and 25 total tackles (12 solo).

=== Tennessee Titans ===
On March 12, 2026, Franklin-Myers signed a three-year, $63 million contract with the Tennessee Titans.

== NFL career statistics ==
Legend
	Led the league
**Bold**	Career high

=== Regular season ===
Year	Team	Games		Tackles					Interceptions						Fumbles				
Year	Team	GP	GS	Cmb	Solo	Ast	Sck	TFL	Int	Yds	Avg	Lng	TD	PD	FF	Fum	FR	Yds	TD
2018	LAR	16	0	10	6	4	2.0	0	0	0	0.0	0	0	0	**1**	0	1	0	0
2020	NYJ	15	2	19	8	11	3.0	5	0	0	0.0	0	0	2	0	0	**2**	0	0
2021	NYJ	16	16	35	17	18	6.0	6	**1**	**32**	**32.0**	**32**	0	1	**1**	0	0	0	0
2022	NYJ	17	17	38	16	**22**	5.0	4	0	0	0.0	0	0	1	0	0	0	0	0
2023	NYJ	17	17	33	15	18	3.5	6	0	0	0.0	0	0	**3**	0	0	0	0	0
2024	DEN	17	16	**40**	**18**	**22**	7.0	**8**	0	0	0.0	0	0	0	0	0	0	0	0
2025	DEN	16	15	25	12	13	**7.5**	6	0	0	0.0	0	0	0	0	0	0	0	0
2026	TEN	9	9	16	7	9	1.5	3	0	0	0.0	0	0	1	0	0	0	0	0
Career		123	92	216	99	117	35.5	38	1	32	32.0	32	0	8	2	0	3	0	0

=== Postseason ===
Year	Team	Games		Tackles					Interceptions						Fumbles				
Year	Team	GP	GS	Cmb	Solo	Ast	Sck	TFL	Int	Yds	Avg	Lng	TD	PD	FF	Fum	FR	Yds	TD
2018	LAR	3	0	**3**	**2**	**1**	**1.0**	0	0	0	0.0	0	0	0	**1**	0	0	0	0
2024	DEN	1	1	0	0	0	0.0	0	0	0	0.0	0	0	0	0	0	0	0	0
2025	DEN	2	2	1	0	**1**	0.0	0	0	0	0.0	0	0	0	0	0	0	0	0
Career		6	3	4	2	2	1.0	0	0	0	0.0	0	0	0	1	0	0	0	0
