= Troy Franklin =

American football player (born 2003)

No. 11 – Denver Broncos
- Position: Wide receiver
- Roster status: Active

Personal information
- Born: February 6, 2003 (age 23); East Palo Alto, California, U.S.
- Listed height: 6 ft 3 in (1.91 m)
- Listed weight: 180 lb (82 kg)

Career information
- High school: Menlo-Atherton (Atherton, California)
- College: Oregon (2021–2023)
- NFL draft: 2024: 4th round, 102nd overall pick

Career history
- Denver Broncos (2024–present)

Awards and highlights
- Second-team All-American (2023); First-team All-Pac-12 (2023); Second-team All-Pac-12 (2022)

Career NFL statistics as of Week 9, 2026
- Receptions: 102
- Receiving yards: 1,072
- Receiving touchdowns: 8
- Stats at Pro Football Reference

Troy Franklin (born February 6, 2003) is an American professional football wide receiver for the Denver Broncos of the National Football League (NFL). He played college football for the Oregon Ducks.

== Early life ==
Franklin attended Menlo-Atherton High School in Atherton, California. During his high school career he had 102 receptions for 1,790 receiving yards and 34 total touchdowns. Franklin was selected to play in the 2021 All-American Bowl. He committed to the University of Oregon to play college football.

== College career ==
Franklin played in all 14 games as a true freshman at Oregon in 2021. He finished the year with 18 receptions for 209 yards and two touchdowns. He returned to Oregon in 2022 as the team's number one receiver. In 2023, he set several single-season records including 1,383 receiving yards, 14 receiving touchdowns, and eight 100-yard receiving games. Franklin set the record for all-time receiving touchdowns––25, tied for most 100-yard receiving games with 11, and also placed second for most consistent catches––30 consecutive games.

=== College statistics ===
| Year | Team | Receiving | | | | | |
| Year | Team | G | Rec | Yds | Avg | Lng | TD |
|---|---|---|---|---|---|---|---|
| 2021 | Oregon | 10 | 18 | 209 | 11.6 | 30 | 2 |
| 2022 | Oregon | 13 | 61 | 891 | 14.6 | 67T | 9 |
| 2023 | Oregon | 13 | 81 | 1,383 | 17.1 | 84 | 14 |
| Career | | 36 | 160 | 2,483 | 15.5 | 84 | 25 |

== Professional career ==
Pre-draft measurables
| Height | Weight | Arm length | Hand span | Wingspan | 40-yard dash | 10-yard split | 20-yard split | 20-yard shuttle | Three-cone drill | Vertical jump | Broad jump |
|---|---|---|---|---|---|---|---|---|---|---|---|
| 6 ft 1 7/8 in (1.88 m) | 176 lb (80 kg) | 31 7/8 in (0.81 m) | 8 3/4 in (0.22 m) | 6 ft 5 1/4 in (1.96 m) | 4.41 s | 1.61 s | 2.58 s | 4.31 s | 6.90 s | 39.0 in (0.99 m) | 10 ft 4 in (3.15 m) |
All values from NFL Combine

Franklin was selected by the Denver Broncos in the fourth round of the 2024 NFL draft, with the 102nd overall pick, reuniting him with his college quarterback Bo Nix, who was the Broncos' first round selection.

Franklin caught his first career touchdown in Week 6 against the Los Angeles Chargers. Notably, every player who touched the ball on the play was a former Oregon Duck, as it was snapped by second-year center Alex Forsyth, then thrown by Nix and caught by Franklin.

== NFL career statistics ==
Legend
| | Led the league |
| **Bold** | Career high |

=== Regular season ===
| Year | Team | Games | | Receiving | | | | | Rushing | | | | | Fumbles | |
| Year | Team | GP | GS | Rec | Yds | Avg | Lng | TD | Att | Yds | Avg | Lng | TD | Fum | Lost |
|---|---|---|---|---|---|---|---|---|---|---|---|---|---|---|---|
| 2024 | DEN | 16 | 6 | 28 | 263 | 9.4 | 30 | 2 | 2 | 8 | **4.0** | 5 | 0 | 0 | 0 |
| 2025 | DEN | 17 | 7 | **65** | **709** | **10.9** | **48** | **6** | **5** | **12** | 2.4 | **11** | 0 | **1** | **1** |
| Career | | 33 | 13 | 93 | 972 | 10.5 | 48 | 8 | 7 | 20 | 2.9 | 11 | 0 | 1 | 1 |

=== Postseason ===
| Year | Team | Games | | Receiving | | | | | Rushing | | | | | Fumbles | |
| Year | Team | GP | GS | Rec | Yds | Avg | Lng | TD | Att | Yds | Avg | Lng | TD | Fum | Lost |
|---|---|---|---|---|---|---|---|---|---|---|---|---|---|---|---|
| 2024 | DEN | 1 | 0 | **2** | **54** | **27.0** | **43** | **1** | 0 | 0 | 0.0 | 0 | 0 | 0 | 0 |
| 2025 | DEN | 1 | 1 | 0 | 0 | 0.0 | 0 | 0 | 0 | 0 | 0.0 | 0 | 0 | 0 | 0 |
| Career | | 2 | 1 | 2 | 54 | 27.0 | 43 | 1 | 0 | 0 | 0.0 | 0 | 0 | 0 | 0 |
