= Jaleel McLaughlin =

American football player (born 2000)

No. 38 – Cleveland Browns
- Position: Running back
- Roster status: Active

Personal information
- Born: September 13, 2000 (age 26); Marshville, North Carolina, U.S.
- Listed height: 5 ft 7 in (1.70 m)
- Listed weight: 187 lb (85 kg)

Career information
- High school: Forest Hills (Marshville)
- College: Notre Dame College (2018–2019); Youngstown State (2020–2022)
- NFL draft: 2023: undrafted

Career history
- Denver Broncos (2023–2025); Cleveland Browns (2026–present)

Awards and highlights
- MVFC Offensive Player of the Year (2022); First-team FCS All-American (2022); 2× First-team All-MVFC (2021, 2022); Second-team All-MVFC (2020); MEC Offensive Player of the Year (2019); 2× First-team DII All-American (2018, 2019); 2× First-team All-MEC (2018, 2019)

Career NFL statistics as of Week 10, 2026
- Rush attempts: 237
- Rushing yards: 1,165
- Rushing touchdowns: 4
- Receptions: 63
- Receiving yards: 277
- Receiving touchdowns: 4
- Stats at Pro Football Reference

Jaleel McLaughlin (/məˈɡlɒflɪn/ mə-GLOF-lin; born September 13, 2000) is an American professional football running back for the Cleveland Browns of the National Football League (NFL). He played college football for the Notre Dame Falcons and Youngstown State Penguins and is the NCAA's all-time leading rusher. McLaughlin was signed by the Denver Broncos as an undrafted free agent in 2023.

== Early life ==
McLaughlin was born on September 13, 2000, and is a native of Marshville, North Carolina. One of four children, he was raised by his mother and battled poverty and homelessness growing up. He also played several sports starting at a young age, including football, basketball and track.

When McLaughlin was in middle school, his mother lost her job and they lived in various places for short periods of time, switching between hotels, motels and relatives' houses. Shortly after, his cousin and role model died of a brain tumor and his grandmother died from a heart attack. McLaughlin had been living in his grandmother's house at the time and lost it when she died, so he lived for several months with his mother and siblings in a car parked outside a McDonald's. McLaughlin and his family moved in with a relative after several months of homelessness and he then entered Forest Hills High School.

At Forest Hills, McLaughlin competed in track, football and basketball. He helped the basketball team win the state championship and earned several championships in track, placing second place in the 400-meter dash at the state championships, as well as third in the 200, also being a member of the winning 4 × 100 metres relay and 4 × 200 metres relay teams. These were the first track championships in school history. In football, he totaled 1,401 rushing yards on 167 attempts with 16 touchdowns in just 12 games, averaging over eight yards per carry. Despite his performance, McLaughlin received no offers to play college football from NCAA Division I teams, with the only interest coming from teams in Division II. Additionally, the majority of teams that were interested in him only wanted him to play defensive back due to his small size (5 ft 7 in). He ultimately committed to play for the Notre Dame Falcons, one of the few schools which said they would allow him to play running back.

== College career ==
In his debut for the Notre Dame College Falcons, the freshman McLaughlin ran for a school-record 302 rushing yards, also the all-time Division II record for most yards by a player in his first game. Several weeks later, he managed to break the record again by posting 340 yards and three touchdowns against West Liberty, even though he played just three quarters. By the fifth game of the season, he was the leading Division II rusher with 1,091 yards, nine touchdowns and an average of 9.3 yards per carry. He finished the year with 2,421 rushing yards on 378 carries with 19 touchdowns, leading all of the NCAA in that category while also leading Division II with 2,699 all-purpose yards. McLaughlin was named a first-team All-American, the first true freshman ever to win the honor for Notre Dame College, and placed third in voting for the Harlon Hill Trophy as top Division II player.

As a sophomore, McLaughlin led Division II in rushing, scoring and yards with an NCAA-leading 2,316 rushing yards and 33 touchdowns. He was the runner-up for the Harlon Hill Trophy, was an All-American, and was named the male athlete of the year in his conference. He transferred to play with the FCS Youngstown State Penguins for his junior season. He finished his stint at Notre Dame College with 4,737 rushing yards and 52 touchdowns. In his first year at Youngstown State, the spring 2021 season (postponed from 2020 due to COVID-19), McLaughlin earned second-team All-Missouri Valley Football Conference (MVFC) honors while running for 691 yards and five scores in seven games. In the fall season, he ran for 1,139 yards and 12 touchdowns, earning first-team All-MVFC and third-team All-American honors. McLaughlin totaled 1,588 rushing yards and 13 touchdowns in his final year, 2022, averaging over seven yards per carry. Entering the second-to-last game of his college career, he needed 219 rushing yards to set the all-time college football record, and he did it by going for 227 yards against Missouri State. He entered the NFL draft after the season, and finished his career as college football's all-time leading rusher, breaking the record that was held by Nate Kmic, with 8,166 yards on 1,250 attempts with 79 touchdowns, averaging 6.5 yards per carry.

== Professional career ==
Pre-draft measurables
Height	Weight	Arm length	Hand span	Wingspan	40-yard dash	10-yard split	20-yard split	20-yard shuttle	Three-cone drill	Vertical jump	Broad jump	Bench press
5 ft 7 3/4 in (1.72 m)	187 lb (85 kg)	30 3/8 in (0.77 m)	8 5/8 in (0.22 m)	6 ft 0 in (1.83 m)	4.44 s	1.60 s	2.44 s	4.30 s	7.43 s	31.0 in (0.79 m)	9 ft 7 in (2.92 m)	17 reps
All values from Pro Day

=== Denver Broncos ===
Despite his college performance, McLaughlin went unselected in the 2023 NFL draft. Afterwards, he was signed by the Denver Broncos as an undrafted free agent. After a standout preseason, he made the team's final roster. He scored his first career touchdown on a five-yard rush against the Washington Commanders in Week 2. In week 4, he ran for 72 yards, averaging 10.3 yards-per-carry, and caught all three targets for 32 yards and a touchdown, being given the game ball afterwards. As a rookie, he appeared in all 17 games and made three starts. He finished the 2023 season with 76 carries for 410 rushing yards and one rushing touchdown to go with 31 receptions for 160 receiving yards and two receiving touchdowns.

Despite being a restricted free agent, the Broncos decided not to tender McLaughlin during the 2026 offseason. However, they later re-signed him to a one-year, $1.145 million contract on March 13, 2026. On August 30, McLaughlin was waived by Denver as a part of final roster cuts.

=== Cleveland Browns ===
On September 1, 2026, McLaughlin signed with the Cleveland Browns' practice squad. On September 15, he was signed to the active roster after Dylan Sampson was placed on injured reserve.
