= The 74 =

American education news website

- The 74 is a non-profit news site covering education in America.
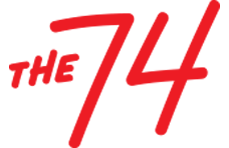
- Founder(s): Campbell Brown, Romy Drucker
- Founded: July 2015
- Headquarters: New York City, New York, United States
- Website: www.the74million.org

The 74 is a nonprofit news website that focuses on and supports school-choice issues in the United States. Co-founded by former CNN host and education reform activist Campbell Brown, the organization's name refers to the 74 million children in America under 18 years of age. Romy Drucker, who previously worked for the New York City Department of Education under Mayor Michael Bloomberg, is co-founder and CEO.

== History ==
Based in New York City, the website launched in July 2015.

== Summits ==
In August 2015, The 74 hosted an education summit in Manchester, New Hampshire, attended by Gov. Jeb Bush, Carly Fiorina, Gov. John Kasich, Gov. Scott Walker, Gov. Bobby Jindal, and Gov. Chris Christie, who were all Republican presidential candidates. The summit was sponsored by the American Federation for Children, the nation's leading school-choice advocacy organization.

The 74 also scheduled a second education summit in Iowa to feature Democratic presidential candidates in conjunction with the Des Moines Register, the state's largest daily newspaper. However, the event was cancelled. In an interview with Politico, Campbell Brown said Democratic candidates were unwilling to attend the event because of pressure from historically Democratic teachers unions eager to move the party away from school reforms implemented under President Barack Obama.

== Funding ==
The 74 launched with a $4 million annual budget. Initial funders included Bloomberg Philanthropies, the Walton Family Foundation, the Carnegie Corporation, and the Dick & Betsy DeVos Family Foundation.

== See also ==
- Institute for Nonprofit News (member)
