= New Broncos Stadium =

Proposed stadium in Denver, Colorado

- Location in Colorado Location in the United States Location in North America
- Interactive map of New Broncos Stadium
- Location: Denver, Colorado, U.S.
- Coordinates: 39°44′00.8″N 105°00′26.4″W
- Owner: Denver Broncos
- Roof: Retractable
- Public transit: 10th & Osage station

Construction
- Groundbreaking: 2027 (planned)
- Opened: 2031 (planned)
- Cost: ~$4 billon (estimated)
- Architect: Manica
- Project managers: Sasaki (overall masterplan); Tryba Architects (Burnham Yard redevelopment masterplan)

Tenant
- Denver Broncos (c. 2031)

Website
- newstadium.denverbroncos.com

New Broncos Stadium is a proposed retractable roof stadium in Denver, Colorado, U.S., scheduled to open in 2031. The stadium will serve as the home venue for the National Football League (NFL) team Denver Broncos and host other sports and events. The proposed site of the stadium is in the Burnham Yard, a former railroad maintenance facility, and surrounding properties in Denver's La Alma/Lincoln Park neighborhood.

== Background ==
The National Football League (NFL)'s Denver Broncos currently play their home games at Empower Field at Mile High, which replaced Mile High Stadium as their home venue in 2001.

Following an internal ownership dispute among the family members of the late Denver Broncos owner Pat Bowlen in 2019, speculation arose concerning the potential sale of the team. Speculation concerning the construction of a new stadium began growing after then-Broncos president Joe Ellis suggested that a new stadium would be "Issue No. 1 on the next owner's plate". In August 2021, Walmart fortune heir Rob Walton purchased the team for $4.65 billion. Following the sale, the new Broncos' ownership team refused to rule out replacing Empower Field with a new, state-of-the-art stadium in the future.

In December 2022, the new ownership group announced $100 million in renovations into Empower Field at Mile High, including the construction of a larger video board, improved concessions, and expanded hospitality space. During the renovation announcement, the team again refused to rule out the possibility of a new stadium's construction in the distant future.

== History ==
In January 2023, the team partnered with Legends Hospitality to survey Broncos fans and stakeholders regarding the construction of a new stadium. The results found that a majority of fans preferred a new stadium with a retractable roof in a near-downtown location. There was also an overwhelming support for a mixed-use development, as well as a focus on the importance of non-gameday amenities and site accessibility.

Starting August 2024, multiple limited liability companies (LLCs) purchased real estate adjacent to the Burnham Yard, the 58-acre site of a railroad facility that had operated from 1871 to 2016, and that is now owned by the state of Colorado. These transactions appeared to have been related to the Broncos' consideration of the Burnham Yard as a stadium location.

On September 9, 2025, the Broncos, City of Denver and State of Colorado announced Burnham Yard as the preferred site for a new stadium. The stadium-anchored community hub will span more than 100 acres, with the team purchasing the 58-acre site for the stadium and 25 acres from Denver Water for surrounding land. Private real estate acquisitions will make up the rest of the stadium complex. The Walton-Penner Family Ownership Group also announced that they will privately fund the stadium, the land, the surrounding development, and the construction costs, with the City of Denver covering $139 million in transportation upgrades in the area through bond issues proposed before the stadium plan was announced, but approved by the voters after the announcement. Among the proposed improvements are upgrades to Denver's Regional Transportation District (RTD) light-rail services to the area, which is served by the 10th & Osage station.

In October 2025, the Broncos partnered with the architectural firm Sasaki to begin the initial designing of the stadium. Broncos CEO Greg Penner emphasized the desire for a raucous atmosphere in the new stadium, stating, "We really want that experience that’s loud," and adding that the team wants it to be "a place that opposing teams don’t want to come play."

On November 5, 2025, the Broncos submitted a 38-page preliminary review plan for the development of the Burnham Yard rail site to the City of Denver. The plan suggested building the new stadium in on the western side of the Burnham Yard site, with building permits to be acquired in 2027. In a statement, the Broncos organization committed to collaborating with city officials and neighboring residents to ensure local concerns are addressed during the stadium's planning phase. In anticipation of this announcement, the City of Denver had already begun a small area plan process for the proposed development and the surrounding area. Community stakeholders also began negotiation directly with the Broncos for a community benefits agreement. A purchase agreement for the Burnham yard was finalized in May 2026, with closing expected fall 2026.

In August 2026, the Broncos released conceptual renderings for the Burnham Yard redevelopment project, which included affordable housing, retail, parks, and other neighborhood improvements. In addition, they announced that Manica Architecture would be the architect for the stadium. In the preliminary plans presented, the 10th & Osage RTD light rail station would be expanded and relocated south of 10th Avenue to accommodate gameday service, and the stadium would also be served by a proposed new station for the Colorado Connector intercity rail service, located at 7th Avenue and Tejon Street southwest of the stadium.
