= Mellody Hobson =

American businesswoman (born 1969)

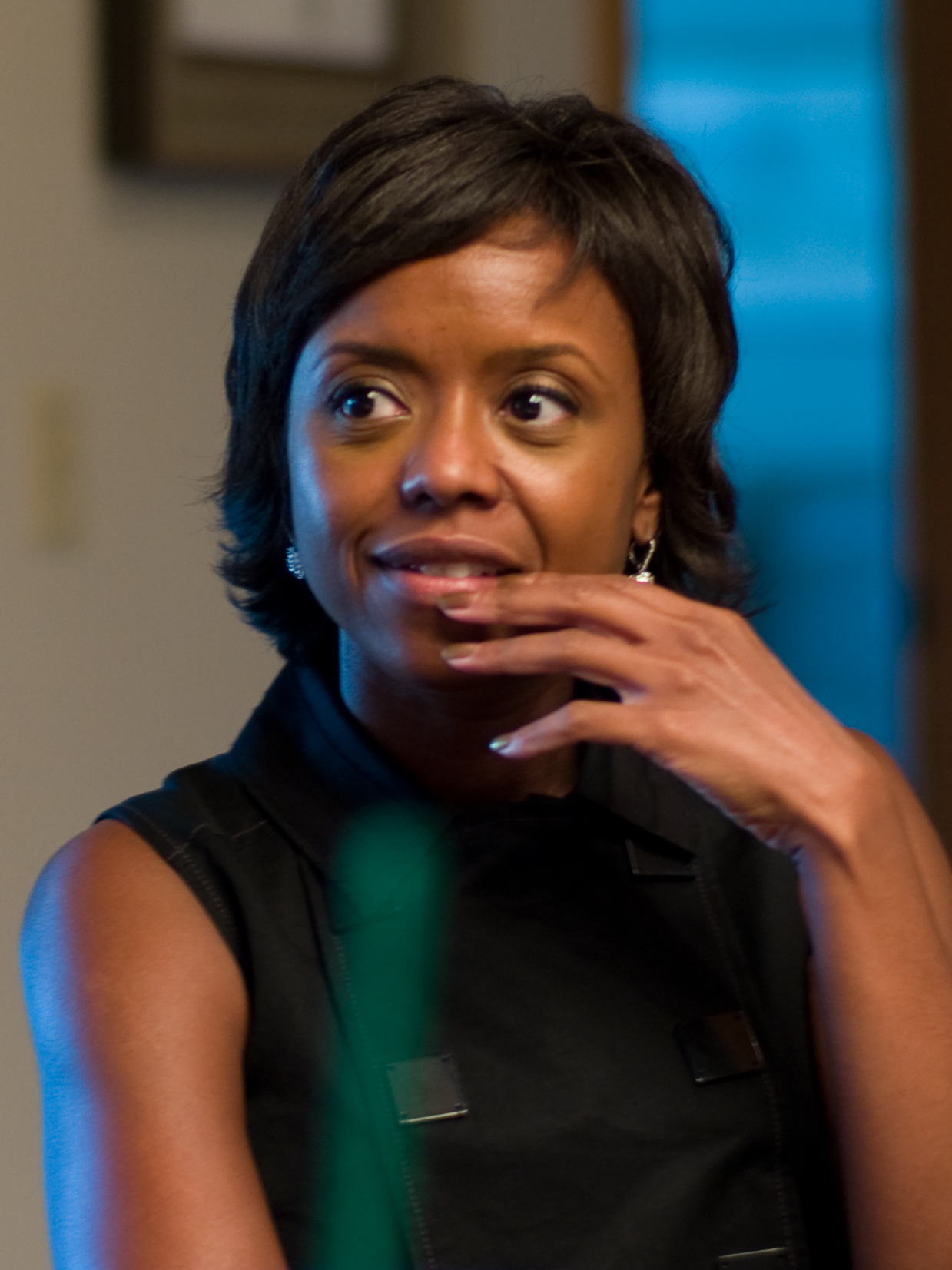
- Hobson in 2007
- Born: Mellody Louise Hobson; April 3, 1969 (age 57); Chicago, Illinois, U.S.
- Education: Princeton University (BA)
- Occupation: Businesswoman
- Spouse: George Lucas (m. 2013)
- Children: 1

Mellody Louise Hobson Lucas (née Hobson; born April 3, 1969) is an American businesswoman who is president and co-CEO of Ariel Investments, and former chair of Starbucks. She is the former chairman of DreamWorks Animation, having stepped down after negotiating the acquisition of DreamWorks Animation SKG, Inc., by NBCUniversal in August 2016. In 2017, she became the first African-American woman to head The Economic Club of Chicago. On December 26, 2020, it was announced she would become chair of Starbucks in 2021, thus becoming the first black woman to chair an S&P 500 company, and making her one of the highest-profile corporate directors in the US. She continued in the role of chair until August 2024.

As of 2020, she is listed as #94 in Forbes list of the World's 100 Most Powerful Women.

== Early life and education ==
Hobson was born on April 3, 1969, in Chicago, as the youngest of six children. Hobson grew up in a household where there was often not enough money to pay the rent or make the car payment. Experiences like this made understanding money, she said, “something that gnawed at me. I wanted to have a different life.”

Hobson graduated from St. Ignatius College Prep in Chicago in 1987 as a first-generation college student. She later graduated from Princeton University in 1991. At Princeton, Hobson was a member of the Cottage Club.

== Career ==
After graduating from Princeton, Hobson joined Ariel Investments, a Chicago investment firm, as an intern. She rose to become a senior vice president and director of marketing. In 2000, she became the company's president. Ariel Investments is one of the largest African American-owned money management and mutual fund companies in the US. Hobson is also chairman of the board of trustees of Ariel Investment Trust and formerly a spokesperson for the annual Ariel/Schwab Black Investor Survey.

She was a contributor to financial segments on Good Morning America and CBS This Morning for many years.

Hobson is on the board of numerous organizations, including JPMorgan Chase & Co. and the Lucas Museum of Narrative Art. She served on Starbucks's board until March 12, 2025. She was also formerly a director of The Estée Lauder Companies Inc. Hobson has been acclaimed in selections such as Time's 2015 Time 100 List, the magazine's annual list of the one hundred most influential people in the world), Ebony magazine's "20 Leaders of the Future" (1992), Working Women Magazine's "20 Under 30" (1992), the World Economic Forum's "Global Leaders of Tomorrow" (2001), Esquire's "America's Best and Brightest" (2002), and The Wall Street Journal's 50 "Women to Watch" (2004).

Hobson created and hosted a show on ABC on May 29, 2009, called Unbroke: What You Need to Know About Money, featuring celebrities such as the Jonas Brothers, Oscar the Grouch and Samuel L. Jackson.

In 2017, Hobson was named to head the Economic Club of Chicago, the first African-American woman to do so.

In June 2018, Hobson was named vice chair of Starbucks Corporation. After heading the finance committee, she was elected to chair the board in 2020. Following the replacement of Laxman Narasimhan as Starbucks CEO on August 13, 2024, it was also announced that Hobson would step down as chair effective September 9, and become lead independent director.

In 2022, Hobson joined an investment group consisting of Rob Walton, Greg Penner, Carrie Walton Penner, Condoleezza Rice, and Lewis Hamilton that purchased the Denver Broncos.

== Philanthropy ==
In October 2020, Hobson and the Hobson/Lucas Family Foundation made the lead gift to establish a residential college at Princeton University.

In 2024, Hobson and her husband George Lucas provided funding for restoration of Girish Kasaravalli's film Ghatashraddha. The restoration is done by Film Heritage Foundation.

== Awards and recognition ==
Hobson appeared on the Jack Good Show in August 2017, where she accepted the City of Birmingham's deepest appreciation for her charitable work with Birmingham's Bright Leaders of Tomorrow.

Hobson was inducted as a Laureate of The Lincoln Academy of Illinois and awarded the Order of Lincoln (the State's highest honor) by the Governor of Illinois in 2018.

== Popular culture ==
In the American television drama The Good Wife, actress Vanessa Williams based her character, self-made businesswoman Courtney Paige, on Hobson, studying her via Hobson's TED talks.

== Personal life ==
Hobson began dating film director and producer George Lucas in 2006, after they met at a business conference in 2005. Hobson and Lucas announced their engagement in January 2013, and were married on June 22, 2013, at Lucas's Skywalker Ranch. They have one daughter who was born via surrogacy in August 2013.

Hobson was photographed by Annie Leibovitz for the 2016 Pirelli Calendar.
