= Greg Penner =

American businessman (born 1969)

- Born: Gregory Boyd Penner; December 18, 1969 (age 56)
- Education: Georgetown University (BA); Stanford University (MBA)
- Occupation: Businessman
- Title: Chairman; Walmart; Co-owner / CEO; Denver Broncos
- Board member of: Baidu; eHarmony; Hyatt Hotels; Teach for America; Charter School Growth Fund
- Spouse: Carrie Walton Penner
- Children: Four

Gregory Boyd Penner (born December 18, 1969) is an American businessman. He is the chairman of Walmart, and co-owner and CEO of the Denver Broncos of the National Football League (NFL). Penner is the son-in-law of S. Robson Walton and the grandson-in-law of Sam Walton, the founder of Walmart.

== Early life ==
Penner is the son of Clifford and Joyce Penner, sex therapists based in Pasadena, California. They have published sex-advice books from a Christian perspective.

He majored in international economics at Georgetown University before earning an MBA from the Stanford Graduate School of Business in 1997.

== Career ==
He worked as a financial analyst at Goldman Sachs.

Prior to succeeding father-in-law Rob Walton as Walmart chairman, Penner held a variety of roles at Walmart. He started as a store employee and eventually became the CFO of Walmart Japan. He was appointed to the Walmart board of directors in 2008 and was named vice-chairman in 2014.

Penner is the founder of Madrone Capital Partners, an investment firm located in Menlo Park, California. He is on the board of directors of Baidu, eHarmony, Hyatt Hotels, Teach for America, and co-chair of Charter School Growth Fund.

On August 9, 2022, the NFL owners approved the purchase of the Denver Broncos by a syndicate consisting of Penner, his wife Carrie, father-in-law Rob Walton, Condoleezza Rice, Mellody Hobson, and Formula One driver Lewis Hamilton. The next day, the Broncos announced that Penner would also be taking over as the team's new CEO after Joe Ellis stepped down from the position. In his role, Penner is the operating head of the franchise and the public face of the Walton-Penner Family Ownership Group. He has primary responsibility for the Broncos' day-to-day operations in collaboration with his partners. He is recognized as the team's controlling owner by the NFL, and represents the Broncos at league meetings.

On April 10, 2026, Penner and his wife purchased a 40% minority stake in the Colorado Rockies, becoming the largest minority owners in the MLB.

== Personal life ==
Penner is married to Carrie Walton Penner, the daughter of Rob Walton. Penner met his wife while they were undergraduates at Georgetown University. They have four children and live in Atherton, California.

He is an active triathlon athlete and mountaineer, having summited Mount Kilimanjaro, Ama Dablam, Vinson Massif, Denali, and Mount Everest.
