= Carrie Walton Penner =

Member of Walton family

- Born: August 12, 1970 (age 55)
- Education: Georgetown University; Stanford University
- Known for: Walton family fortune, charter schools
- Board member of: Charter School Growth Fund; KIPP Foundation; Alliance for School Choice; Stanford University
- Spouse: Greg Penner
- Children: 4
- Parent: S. Robson Walton

Carrie Walton Penner (born August 12, 1970) is the granddaughter of Sam Walton, the founder of Walmart, and the daughter of former company chairman S. Robson Walton.

Walton Penner is an influential figure in the charter school movement. She is a co-owner of the Denver Broncos and a minority owner of the Colorado Rockies.

== Education ==
Walton Penner attended private school at The Governor's Academy in Newbury, Massachusetts. She graduated prep school in 1988, and then went to Georgetown, and studied economics and history. In the mid-1990s, she was involved in education issues and earned a master's degree in Education Policy and Program Evaluation at Stanford University.

== Career ==
Walton Penner has been the education program committee chair for the Walton Family Foundation, an evaluator for the National Foundation for Teaching Entrepreneurship and had internships at the Rockefeller Foundation, Aaron Diamond Foundation, and Academy for Educational Development. She was also a research analyst for an evaluation of the Michigan Mathematics and Science Centers for Woodside Research Consortium.

On August 9, 2022, the NFL owners approved the purchase of the Denver Broncos by the Walton Penner Group (consisting of Walton Penner, her husband Greg, S. Robson Walton, Condoleezza Rice, Mellody Hobson, and Sir Lewis Hamilton). In her role, she is actively engaged with Broncos ownership and executives on all matters related to the organization.

This group is now known as the Penner Sports Group. On April 10, 2026, Penner Sports Group purchased a 40% minority stake in the Colorado Rockies, becoming the largest minority owners in the MLB.

== Personal life ==
Walton Penner is married to Greg Penner, who was named the Chairman of Walmart in 2015. They met while attending Georgetown University as undergraduates. They have four children and live in Atherton, California.

== Board memberships ==
She is on the board of KIPP Foundation, Alliance for School Choice, Stanford University and Charter School Growth Fund.
