= Denver Broncos =

NFL team in Denver, Colorado

- Current season
Logo	Wordmark
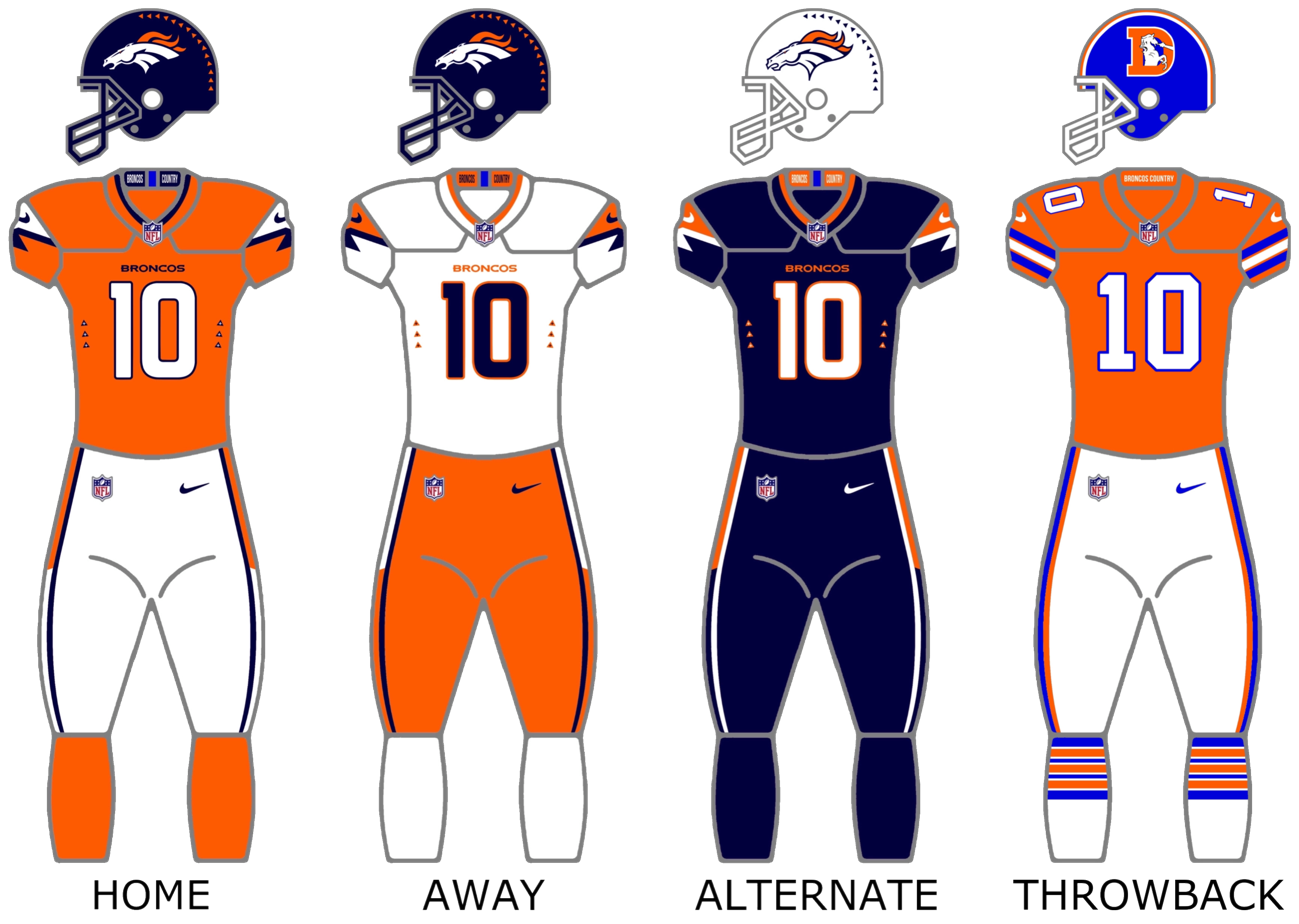
- Uniforms

General information
- Founded: August 14, 1959; 67 years ago
- Stadium: Empower Field at Mile High; Denver, Colorado
- Headquartered: Broncos Park Powered by CommonSpirit, Dove Valley, Colorado
- Colors: Sunset orange, midnight navy, summit white
- Mascot: Thunder (live horse); Miles (costume suit)
- Website: denverbroncos.com

Personnel
- Owner: Rob Walton (Note: Other members of the ownership group include Carrie Walton Penner, Greg Penner, Mellody Hobson, Condoleezza Rice, and Lewis Hamilton)
- CEO: Greg Penner
- General manager: George Paton
- Head coach: Sean Payton
- President: Damani Leech

Nicknames
- Orange Crush (defense, 1977–1983); No Fly Zone (defense, 2014–2018)

Team history
- Denver Broncos (1960–present)

Home fields
- Mile High Stadium (1960–2000); Empower Field at Mile High (2001–present)

League / conference affiliations
- American Football League (1960–1969): Western Division (1960–1969); National Football League (1970–present): American Football Conference (1970–present); AFC West (1970–present)

Championships
- Super Bowl championships: 3 1997 (XXXII), 1998 (XXXIII), 2015 (50)
- Conference championships: 8: AFC: 1977, 1986, 1987, 1989, 1997, 1998, 2013, 2015
- Division championships: 16: AFC West: 1977, 1978, 1984, 1986, 1987, 1989, 1991, 1996, 1998, 2005, 2011, 2012, 2013, 2014, 2015, 2025

Playoff appearances (24)
- NFL: 1977, 1978, 1979, 1983, 1984, 1986, 1987, 1989, 1991, 1993, 1996, 1997, 1998, 2000, 2003, 2004, 2005, 2011, 2012, 2013, 2014, 2015, 2024, 2025

Owners
- Bob Howsam (1959–1961); Gerald Phipps (1961–1981); Edgar Kaiser Jr. (1981–1984); Pat Bowlen (1984–2019); Pat Bowlen Trust (2019–2022); Walton-Penner Family Ownership Group (2022–present)

The Denver Broncos are a professional American football team based in Denver. The Broncos compete in the National Football League (NFL) as a member of the American Football Conference (AFC) West division. The team is headquartered in Englewood, Colorado.

The team began play in 1960 as a charter member of the American Football League (AFL) and joined the NFL as part of the merger in 1970. The Broncos are currently owned by a syndicate headed by former Walmart chairman Rob Walton and current Walmart chairman Greg Penner. Since 2001, the Broncos have played their regular season home games at Empower Field at Mile High; Denver previously played its home games at Mile High Stadium from its inception in 1960 through the 2000 season.

The Broncos were barely competitive during their 10-year run in the AFL and their first three years in the NFL. They did not have a winning season until 1973 and qualified for their first playoffs in 1977, eventually advancing to Super Bowl XII that season. From 1973 to 2016, the Broncos suffered only eleven losing seasons and won 3 Super Bowls, becoming one of the NFL's most successful teams. They have won eight AFC Championships (1977, 1986, 1987, 1989, 1997, 1998, 2013, 2015), and three Super Bowl championships (1997 (XXXII), 1998 (XXXIII), 2015 (50). The Broncos have nine primary members enshrined in the Pro Football Hall of Fame: John Elway, Floyd Little, Shannon Sharpe, Gary Zimmerman, Terrell Davis, Champ Bailey, Steve Atwater, and Randy Gradishar, along with late club owner Pat Bowlen.

According to Forbes, the Broncos are valued at $6.8 billion in September 2025 making them the thirteenth most-valuable team in the NFL.

== History ==
=== Bob Howsam/Gerald Phipps era (1960–1980) ===
The Denver Broncos were founded on August 14, 1959, when minor league baseball owner Bob Howsam was awarded an American Football League (AFL) charter franchise. The Broncos won the first-ever AFL game over the Boston Patriots 13–10, on September 9, 1960. Seven years later on August 5, 1967, they became the first-ever AFL team to defeat an NFL team, with a 13–7 win over the Detroit Lions in a preseason game. However, the Broncos were not successful in the 1960s, winning more than five games only once (7–7, 1962), compiling a 39–97–4 (.293) record during the ten seasons of the AFL.

Denver came close to losing its franchise in 1965, until a local ownership group took control, and rebuilt the team. The team's first superstar, "Franchise" Floyd Little, was instrumental in keeping the team in Denver, due to his signing in 1967 as well as his Pro Bowl efforts on and off the field. The Broncos were the only original AFL team that never played in the title game, as well as the only original AFL team never to have a winning season while a member of the AFL during the upstart league's 10-year history.

In 1972, the Broncos hired former Stanford University coach John Ralston as their head coach. In 1973, he was the UPI's AFC Coach of the Year, after Denver achieved its first winning season at 7–5–2. In five seasons with the Broncos, Ralston guided the team to three winning seasons. Though Ralston finished the 1976 season with a 9–5 record, the team, as was the case in Ralston's previous winning seasons, still missed the playoffs. Following the season, several prominent players publicly voiced their discontent with Ralston, which soon led to his resignation.

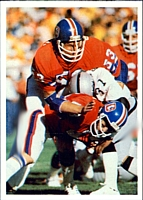
The Broncos defeated the Raiders in the 1977–78 AFC Championship Game to earn their first trip to the Super Bowl.

Red Miller, a long-time assistant coach, was hired and along with the Orange Crush Defense (a nickname originated in 1977, also the brand of the popular orange-flavored soft drink) and aging Denver Broncos starting quarterback Craig Morton, took the Broncos to what was then a record-setting 12–2 regular-season record and their first playoff appearance in 1977, and ultimately made their first Super Bowl appearance in Super Bowl XII, in which they were defeated by the Dallas Cowboys (Morton's former team), 27–10.

=== Edgar Kaiser/Pat Bowlen era (1981–2022) ===
In 1981, Broncos' owner Gerald Phipps, who had purchased the team in May 1961 from the original owner Bob Howsam, sold the team to Canadian financier Edgar Kaiser Jr., grandson of shipbuilding industrialist Henry J. Kaiser. In 1984, the team was purchased by another Canadian, Pat Bowlen, who placed team ownership into a family trust sometime before 2004 and remained in day-to-day control until his battle with Alzheimer's disease forced him to cede the team to Joe Ellis in 2014.

==== Dan Reeves years (1981–1992) ====
Dan Reeves became the youngest head coach (37) in the NFL when he joined the Broncos in 1981 as vice president and head coach. Quarterback John Elway, who played college football at Stanford, arrived in 1983 via a trade. Originally drafted by the Baltimore Colts as the first pick of the draft, Elway proclaimed that he would shun football in favor of baseball (he was drafted by the New York Yankees to play center field and was also a pitching prospect), unless he was traded to a selected list of other teams, which included the Broncos. Prior to Elway, the Broncos had over 24 different starting quarterbacks in its 23 seasons to that point.

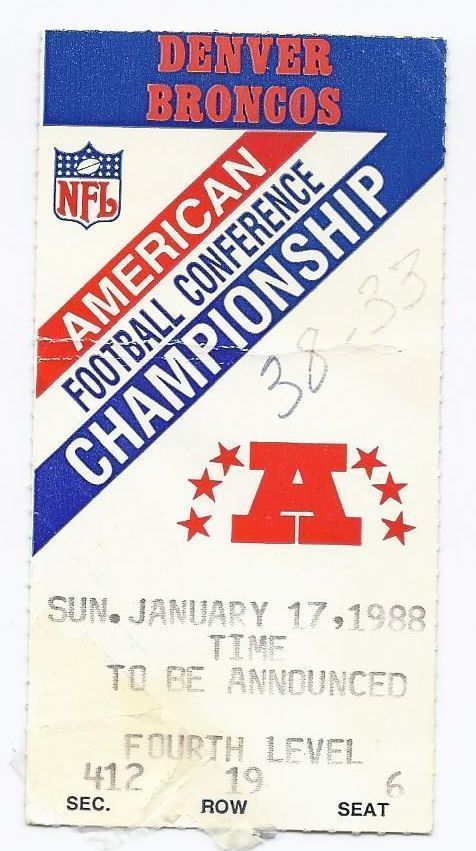
A ticket for the 1987–88 AFC Championship Game between the Browns and the Broncos.

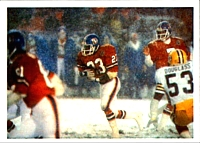
John Elway (right) hands the ball for a rushing play against the Packers in 1984.

Reeves and Elway guided the Broncos to six post-season appearances, five AFC West divisional titles, three AFC championships and three Super Bowl appearances (Super Bowl XXI, XXII and XXIV) during their 12-year span together. The Broncos lost Super Bowl XXI to the New York Giants, 39–20; Super Bowl XXII to the Washington Redskins, 42–10; and Super Bowl XXIV to the San Francisco 49ers, 55–10; the latter score remains the most lopsided scoring differential in Super Bowl history. The last year of the Reeves-Elway era were marked by feuding, due to Reeves taking on play-calling duties after ousting Elway's favorite offensive coordinator Mike Shanahan after the 1991 season, as well as Reeves drafting quarterback Tommy Maddox out of UCLA instead of going with a wide receiver to help Elway. Reeves was fired after the 1992 season and replaced by his protégé and friend Wade Phillips, who had been serving as the Broncos' defensive coordinator. Phillips was fired after a mediocre 1994 season, in which management felt he lost control of the team.

==== Mike Shanahan years (1995–2008) ====
In 1995, Mike Shanahan, who had formerly served under Reeves as the Broncos' offensive coordinator, returned as head coach. The team went 8–8 in 1995. Shanahan drafted rookie running back Terrell Davis. In 1996, the Broncos were the top seed in the AFC with a 13–3 record, dominating most of the teams that year. The fifth-seeded Jacksonville Jaguars, however, upset the Broncos 30–27 in the divisional round of the playoffs, ending the Broncos' 1996 run.

===== Super Bowl XXXII champions (1997) =====
During the 1997 season, Elway and Davis helped guide the Broncos to their first Super Bowl victory, a 31–24 win over the defending champion Green Bay Packers in Super Bowl XXXII. Though Elway completed only 13 of 22 passes, throwing one interception and no touchdowns (he did, however, have a rushing touchdown), Davis rushed for 157 yards and a Super Bowl-record three touchdowns to earn the Super Bowl Most Valuable Player Award—this while overcoming a severe migraine headache that caused him blurred vision.

===== Super Bowl XXXIII champions (1998) =====
The Broncos repeated as Super Bowl champions the following season, defeating the Atlanta Falcons (led by Elway's longtime head coach Dan Reeves) in Super Bowl XXXIII, 34–19. Elway was named Super Bowl MVP, completing 18 of 29 passes for 336 yards, with an 80-yard touchdown to wide receiver Rod Smith and one interception. John Elway retired following the 1998 season, and Brian Griese started at quarterback for the next four seasons. After a 6–10 record in 1999, mostly due to a season-ending injury to Terrell Davis, the Broncos recovered in 2000, earning a Wild Card playoff berth, but losing to the eventual Super Bowl champion Baltimore Ravens. After missing the playoffs the following two seasons, former Arizona Cardinals' quarterback Jake Plummer replaced Griese in 2003, and led the Broncos to two straight 10–6 seasons, earning Wild Card playoff berths both years. However, the Broncos went on the road to face the Indianapolis Colts in back-to-back seasons and were blown out by more than 20 points in each game, allowing a combined 90 points.

In the years following the back-to-back championships, a league investigation found that the team had circumvented the salary cap in both seasons and the 1996 season by deferring additional money to Elway and Davis outside of the salary cap. In addition, they purposefully avoided waiving certain players before a certain date. Denver claimed the moves did not give them additional competitive advantage. The NFL gave no formal statement, although between two separate punishments stripped the team of their third-round picks in the 2002 and 2005 drafts and fined them nearly $2 million combined.

Plummer led the Broncos to a 13–3 record in 2005 and their first AFC West division title since 1998. After a first-round bye, the Broncos defeated the defending Super Bowl champion New England Patriots, 27–13, denying New England from becoming the first NFL team ever to win three consecutive Super Bowl championships. They were the first team to beat the Patriots in the playoffs during the Tom Brady era. The Broncos' playoff run came to an end the next week, after losing at home to the Pittsburgh Steelers in the AFC Championship game, 34–17.

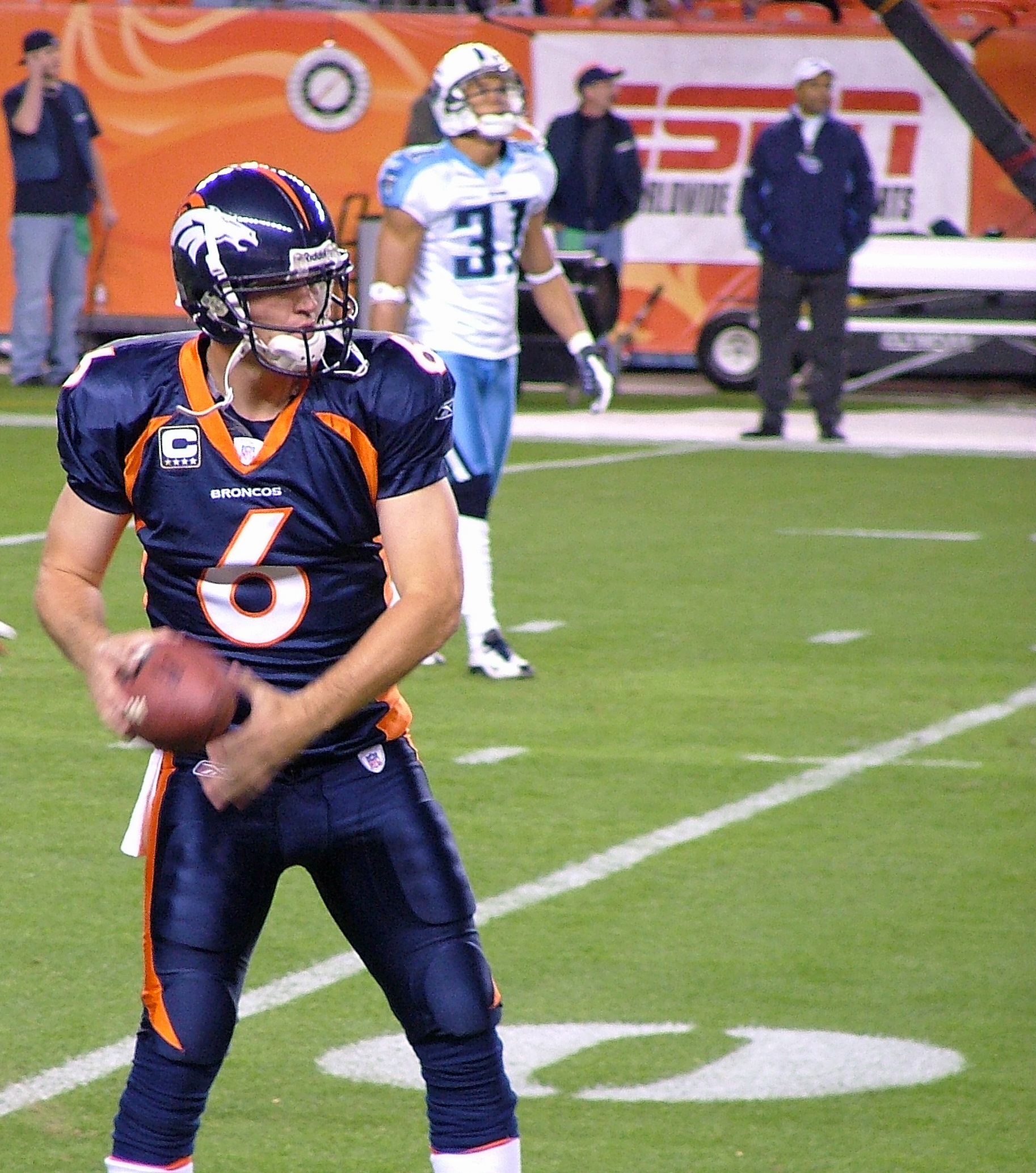
Broncos' quarterback Jay Cutler in 2007.

The Broncos' defense began the first five games of the 2006 season allowing only one touchdown — an NFL record that still stands. ESPN commentator and Super Bowl-winning quarterback Joe Theismann gave the 2006 defense the name "Bad Blue" on Monday Night Football as they played the Ravens. However, the team struggled down the season stretch. Plummer led the team to a 7–2 record, but struggled individually with inconsistent performance and more interceptions than touchdown passes. As a result, he would be replaced by rookie quarterback Jay Cutler. Cutler went 2–3 as a starter, and the Broncos finished with a 9–7 record, losing the tiebreaker to the Kansas City Chiefs for the final playoff spot. Cutler's first full season as a starter in 2007 became the Broncos' first losing season since 1999, with a 7–9 record.

The 2008 season ended in a 52–21 loss at the San Diego Chargers, giving the Broncos an 8–8 record and their third straight season out of the playoffs. Mike Shanahan, the longest-tenured and most successful head coach in Broncos' franchise history, was fired after 14 seasons.

==== Josh McDaniels years (2009–2010) ====
On January 11, 2009, two weeks after Shanahan was fired, the Broncos hired former New England Patriots' offensive coordinator Josh McDaniels as the team's new head coach. Three months later, the team acquired quarterback Kyle Orton as part of a trade that sent Jay Cutler to the Chicago Bears.

Under McDaniels and Orton, the Broncos jumped out to a surprising 6–0 start in 2009. However, the team lost eight of their next ten games, finishing 8–8 for a second consecutive season and missing the playoffs. The next season (2010), the Broncos set a new franchise record for losses in a single season, with a 4–12 record. McDaniels was fired before the end of the 2010 season following a combination of the team's poor record and the fallout from a highly publicized videotaping scandal. Running backs coach Eric Studesville was named interim coach for the final four games of the 2010 season. He chose to start rookie first-round draft choice Tim Tebow at quarterback for the final three games.

==== John Fox years (2011–2014) ====
Following the 2010 season, Joe Ellis was promoted from chief operating officer to team president, while John Elway returned to the organization as the team's executive vice president of football operations. In addition, the Broncos hired John Fox as the team's 14th head coach. Fox previously served as the Carolina Panthers' head coach from 2002 to 2010.

Following a 1–4 start to the 2011 season, Tim Tebow replaced Kyle Orton as the Broncos' starting quarterback. Under Tebow, the Broncos finished the regular season with an 8–8 record, winning the AFC West and qualifying for the playoffs for the first time since 2005. In the Wild Card round, the Broncos defeated the Pittsburgh Steelers on an 80-yard touchdown pass from Tebow to Demaryius Thomas on the first play of overtime, which set an NFL record for the longest play from scrimmage in overtime. However, the Broncos lost to the New England Patriots in the Divisional round.

In March 2012, the Broncos reached an agreement on a five-year, $96 million contract with former longtime Indianapolis Colts' quarterback Peyton Manning, who had recently missed the entire 2011 season following multiple neck surgeries. This resulted in the Broncos subsequently trading incumbent quarterback Tim Tebow to the New York Jets. The Broncos finished with a 13–3 record and the AFC's No. 1 seed in the 2012 playoffs, but were defeated by the Baltimore Ravens in the Divisional round.

Like in 2012, the 2013 Broncos finished with a 13–3 record and the AFC's No. 1 seed. The Broncos broke all offensive records and QB Peyton Manning shattered many quarterback records that season as well. In the 2013 playoffs, they defeated the San Diego Chargers in the Divisional round and the New England Patriots in the AFC Championship. However, the Broncos lost to the Seattle Seahawks in Super Bowl XLVIII by a score of 43–8, the Broncos' first Super Bowl berth since winning back-to-back Super Bowls in 1997 and 1998.

Prior to the start of the 2014 season, the Broncos announced that Pat Bowlen, the team's owner since 1984, relinquished control of the team due to his battle with Alzheimer's disease, resulting in team president Joe Ellis and general manager John Elway assuming control of the team. The Broncos finished the 2014 season with a 12–4 record and the AFC's No. 2 seed. However, the Broncos were defeated by the Indianapolis Colts in the Divisional round of the 2014 playoffs, marking the third time in four seasons that the Broncos lost in the Divisional round of the playoffs. Quarterback Peyton Manning had been playing with strained quadriceps for the final month of the 2014 season.

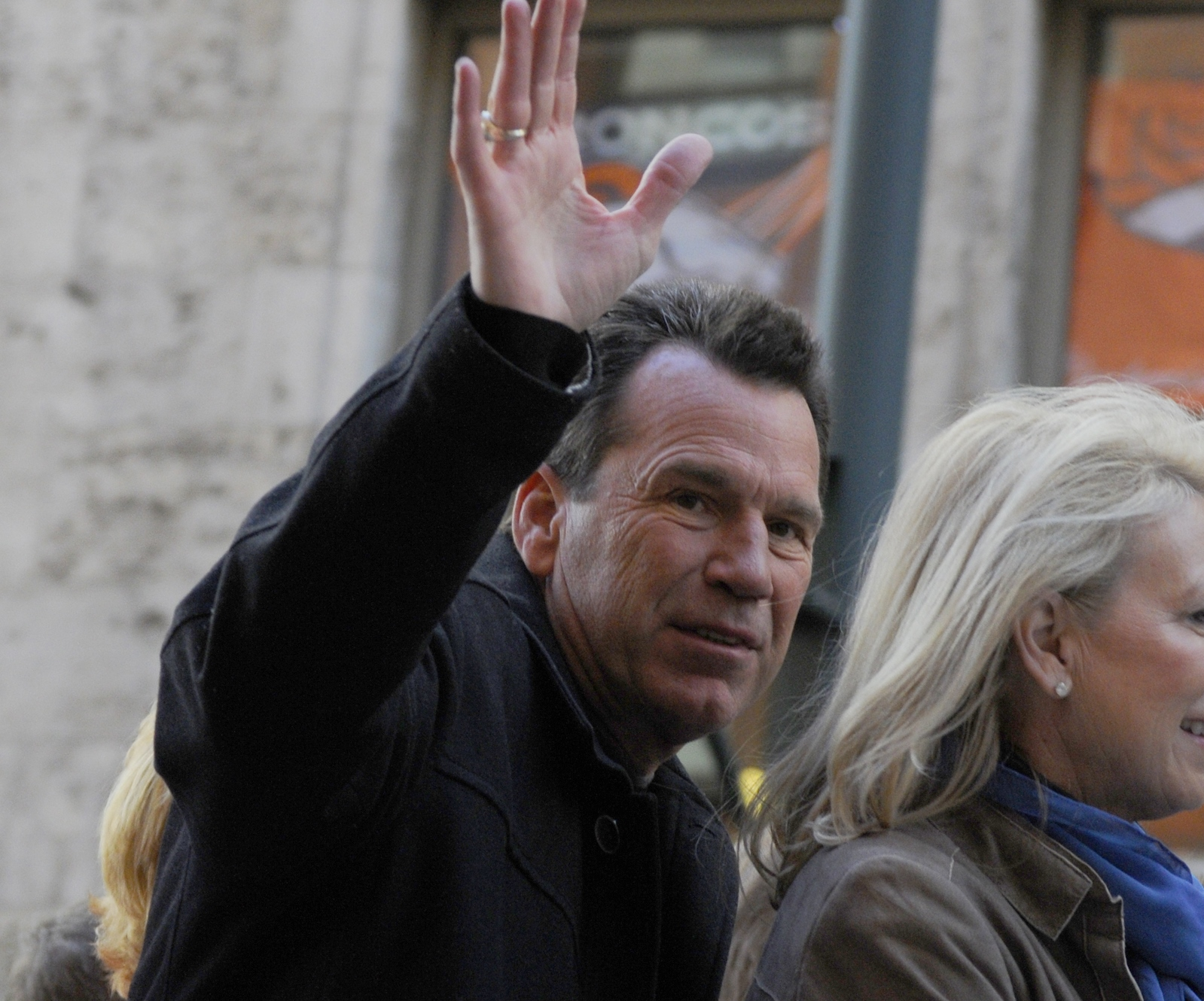
Gary Kubiak won Super Bowl 50 in his first season as the Broncos head coach.

==== Gary Kubiak years (2015–2016) ====
On January 12, 2015, one day after the divisional playoff loss to the Colts, the Broncos and head coach John Fox mutually agreed to part ways. Fox left the Broncos with a .719 winning percentage in his four seasons as the Broncos' head coach—the highest in franchise history. One week later, the Broncos hired Gary Kubiak as the team's 15th head coach. Kubiak served as a backup quarterback to executive vice president/general manager John Elway from 1983 to 1991, as well as the Broncos' offensive coordinator from 1995 to 2005.

===== Super Bowl 50 champions (2015) =====
Shortly after Kubiak became head coach, the Broncos underwent numerous changes to their coaching staff and players, including the hiring of defensive coordinator, defensive mastermind Wade Phillips, under whom the Broncos' defense went from middle of the road to being ranked No. 1 in the NFL. By the 2015 season, it would go on to be considered one of the greatest NFL defenses of all time — along with the 1985 Bears, 2000 Ravens and 2002 Buccaneers. The Broncos finished with a 12–4 record and the AFC's No. 1 seed, despite Peyton Manning having his worst statistical season since his rookie year with the Indianapolis Colts in 1998. Backup quarterback Brock Osweiler started the last six games of the regular season due to Manning suffering from a foot injury. Manning led the Broncos throughout the playoffs. The Broncos defeated the Pittsburgh Steelers 23–16 in the Divisional Round and the New England Patriots 20–18 in the AFC Championship. They were victorious against the Carolina Panthers 24–10 in Super Bowl 50 for their third Super Bowl title.

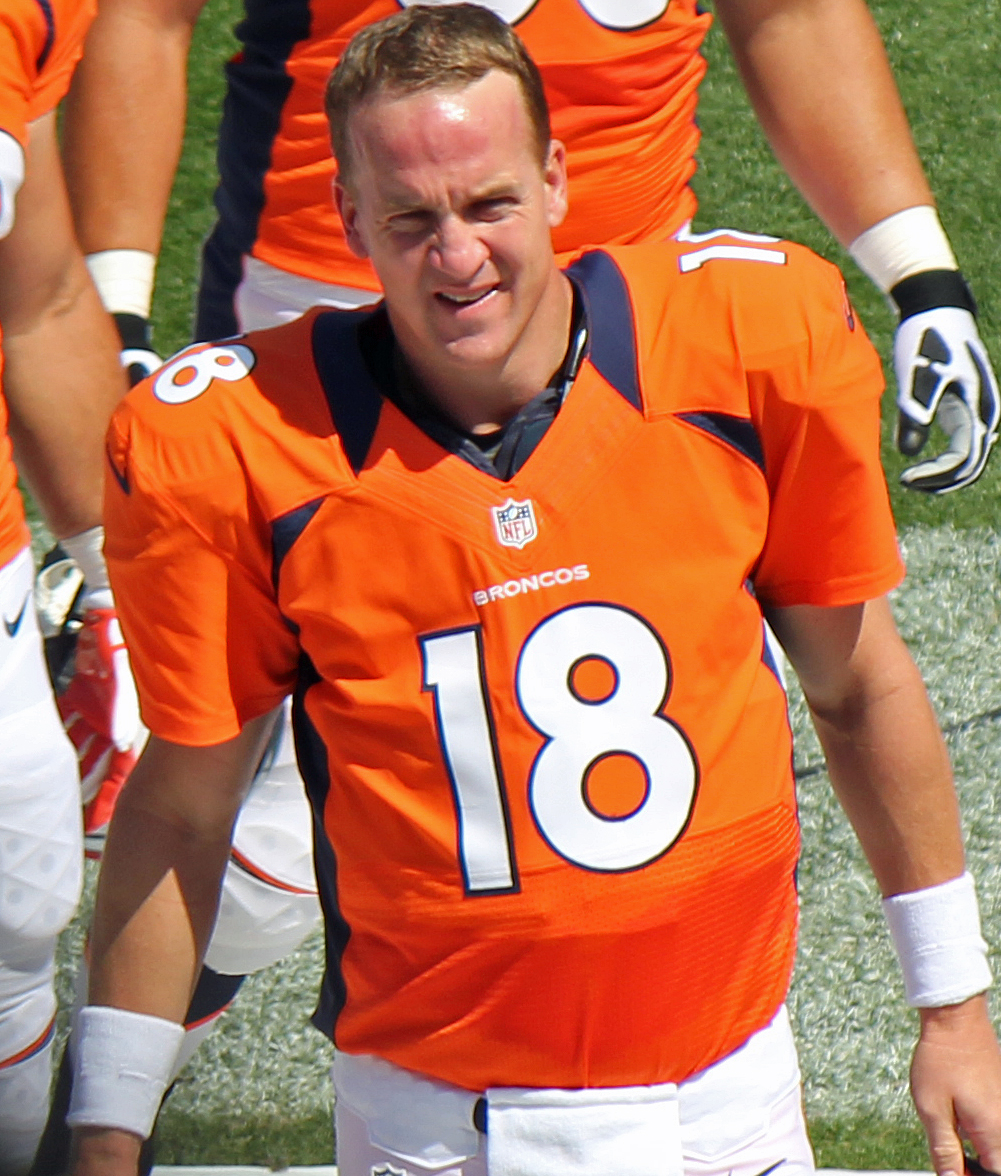
Quarterback Peyton Manning led the Broncos to two Super Bowl appearances, including a win at Super Bowl 50.

On March 7, 2016, quarterback Peyton Manning retired after 18 NFL seasons during a press conference at the team's Dove Valley headquarters.

Following Manning's retirement, the Broncos scrambled to find the team's next starting quarterback after backup quarterback Brock Osweiler departed on a four-year contract to the Houston Texans. The Broncos acquired Mark Sanchez from the Philadelphia Eagles and selected Paxton Lynch during the 2016 draft. Sanchez, Lynch and second-year quarterback Trevor Siemian competed for the starting quarterback spot during the off-season and preseason. Prior to the regular season, Sanchez was released and Siemian was named the starter. The Broncos finished the season 9–7 and missed the playoffs for the first time since 2010.

On January 2, 2017, coach Gary Kubiak announced his retirement, citing health as the main reason for retiring.

==== Vance Joseph years (2017–2018) ====
The Broncos hired Miami Dolphins defensive coordinator Vance Joseph as head coach on January 11, 2017. The Broncos finished 5–11 in 2017 as a result of an unimpressive offense led by a quarterback committee of Trevor Siemian, Brock Osweiler, and Paxton Lynch.

In an effort to address poor production from the offense, the Broncos signed quarterback Case Keenum on March 14, 2018, and traded away Trevor Siemian to the Minnesota Vikings on March 19, 2018.

On May 1, 2018, the Broncos signed local undrafted free agent running back Phillip Lindsay, who became a fan favorite due to his underdog mentality, explosive play style and local roots. Lindsay became the first undrafted player in NFL history with 100+ scrimmage yards in each of their first two games and on December 18, 2018, Lindsay was voted to the 2019 Pro Bowl, making him the first undrafted offensive rookie in NFL history to be voted to a Pro Bowl.

After getting off to a strong start, their 2018 season was up and down, eventually finishing with a 6–10 record and placing third in the AFC West. Coupled with the 5–11 season in 2017, the Broncos had back-to-back losing seasons for the first time since 1971–1972. Shortly after the conclusion of the regular season, head coach Vance Joseph was fired after recording a poor 11–21 record in two seasons.

==== Vic Fangio years (2019–2021) ====
On January 10, 2019, the Broncos hired Chicago Bears defensive coordinator Vic Fangio to become the 17th head coach in franchise history. Fangio was chosen over Mike Munchak, the Broncos' offensive line coach. Fangio received a four-year contract with a team option for an additional season.

On February 13, 2019, Joe Flacco was traded to the Broncos from the Baltimore Ravens. On October 6, 2019, the Broncos defeated the Los Angeles Chargers for their 500th win, bringing their win–loss record to 500–432.

On December 1, 2019, the Broncos started Mizzou rookie quarterback Drew Lock for the first time. He led the Broncos to a 4–1 record to end the 2019 season. The Broncos finished 2nd place in the AFC West Division at 7–9, missing the playoffs for a fourth consecutive year. In five games, Lock finished with 1,020 passing yards, seven touchdowns, and three interceptions.

Due to the COVID-19 pandemic, the 2020 NFL season did not have a preseason or full training camps, which likely contributed to an abnormally large amount of injuries that plagued the Broncos and other NFL teams. Star linebacker Von Miller suffered a season-ending ankle tendon injury before the regular season started, and starting wide receiver Courtland Sutton suffered a season-ending torn ACL during a week two game.

On November 29, 2020, after all three of the Broncos' quarterbacks were placed in COVID-19 protocol, the Broncos were forced to turn to undrafted wide receiver and former college quarterback Kendall Hinton as the emergency quarterback. Hinton completed only one pass for 13 yards in 9 attempts—the fewest pass completions in a single game in franchise history—and was intercepted twice. The Broncos' only scoring play was a 58-yard field goal by placekicker Brandon McManus in a 31–3 loss to the New Orleans Saints. In July 2021, the Pro Football Hall of Fame announced that Hinton's quarterback wristband would be added to the Hall of Fame as part of a display.

The Broncos finished the 2020 season with a record of 5–11, last in the AFC West, and missed the playoffs for the fifth consecutive year.

Following another season of uninspiring quarterback performances, the Broncos were the subject of multiple quarterback trade rumors during the 2021 offseason. Aaron Rodgers and Deshaun Watson were two names rumored to be of interest for the Broncos, but ultimately the Broncos traded for quarterback Teddy Bridgewater on April 28, 2021. Bridgewater won the subsequent quarterback competition between himself and Drew Lock during the preseason, and he was named the Broncos' starting quarterback on August 25, 2021.

The Broncos also made notable improvements in the defensive secondary, signing former All-Pro cornerback Kyle Fuller and cornerback Ronald Darby, as well as drafting Alabama cornerback Patrick Surtain II with the ninth overall pick in the 2021 NFL draft. Running back Phillip Lindsay was replaced by UNC rookie running back Javonte Williams, who was drafted in the second round of the 2021 NFL draft by the Broncos.

On October 31, 2021, Peyton Manning (who won two AFC Championships, Super Bowl 50, and an NFL MVP during his four seasons as a Bronco) was inducted to the Broncos' Ring of Fame during a game against Washington.

On November 1, 2021, the Broncos traded franchise legend Von Miller to the Los Angeles Rams in exchange for a 2nd and 3rd round pick in the 2022 NFL draft. At the time of the trade, Miller was the longest-tenured Bronco on the team, and the only remaining non-special teams player from Denver's Super Bowl 50 roster.

After another mediocre performance in the 2021 season with the Broncos going 7–10, head coach Vic Fangio was dismissed on January 8, 2022, after losing to the Kansas City Chiefs.

=== Walton–Penner era (2022–present) ===
==== Nathaniel Hackett season (2022) ====
The Broncos announced the hiring of Green Bay Packers offensive coordinator Nathaniel Hackett as head coach on January 27, 2022.

The Broncos then announced on February 1, 2022, that they were now up for sale and that they would be parting ways with the Bowlen family, the former owners of the franchise.

Hackett's first hire as head coach was Justin Outten as offensive coordinator. He was hired on February 2, 2022.

On March 16, 2022, the Broncos traded Drew Lock, Noah Fant, Shelby Harris, Denver's 2022 first-round pick (No. 9), its 2022 second-round pick (No. 40), its 2023 first- and second-round picks, and its 2022 fifth-round pick for Russell Wilson and the Seattle Seahawks' 2022 fourth-round pick.

On June 7, 2022, the Broncos announced that a consortium led by former Walmart chairman Rob Walton had entered in an agreement to acquire the Denver Broncos for $4.65 billion. The NFL approved the bid on August 10, 2022. On that day, the members of Walton's partnership, known as the Walton-Penner Family Ownership Group, were introduced to the press. The group includes Rob Walton, his daughter Carrie Walton Penner, son-in-law and current Walmart chairman Greg Penner, Starbucks chairwoman Mellody Hobson, former Secretary of State Condoleezza Rice, and Formula One driver Lewis Hamilton. Walton delegated most of his authority to Penner, who became CEO and operating head of the franchise as well as the public face of the Walton-Penner Group. Penner is recognized as the team's controlling owner by the NFL, and represents the Broncos at league meetings.

On December 26, with the Broncos sitting at 4–11 following a 51–14 Christmas Day loss to the Los Angeles Rams, Hackett was fired and replaced by interim head coach Jerry Rosburg. Hackett became the fifth head coach to not finish his first season after Lou Holtz in 1976, Pete McCulley in 1978, Bobby Petrino in 2007, and Urban Meyer in 2021.

==== Sean Payton years (2023–present) ====
On January 31, 2023, Sean Payton reported that he had accepted the head coaching job for the Denver Broncos, and he was officially hired as head coach for the 2023 season three days later.

The Broncos started the season off 1–5, including a 20–70 loss to the Miami Dolphins in week 3. However, after a 21–31 loss to the New York Jets, the team rallied off five straight wins, including victories over the Buffalo Bills, Green Bay Packers, and Kansas City Chiefs; their first win against the Chiefs since 2015, to get to 6–5. After a loss to the Houston Texans and a victory over the Los Angeles Chargers, the Broncos won just one of their final four games, including a 23–26 loss to the New England Patriots at home on Christmas Eve. After the loss, reports surfaced about contract disputes between Russell Wilson and Broncos management over an injury clause, causing Wilson to be benched by the team the final two games of the season. The Broncos finished the 2023 season 8–9, good enough for their best record since the 2016 season. However, the team finished under .500 for the seventh consecutive season, and missed the playoffs for the eighth consecutive season.

Following the season, the Broncos released Russell Wilson, taking on $85M in dead-cap money, the largest in NFL history.

On March 7, the Broncos released veteran safety Justin Simmons. Simmons was the longest tenured player on the Broncos following Brandon McManus' departure the previous offseason.

On April 22, The Broncos unveiled a new set of uniforms known as the "Mile High Collection," which was the team's first uniform change since the 1997 season. A throwback uniform also pays homage to the 1977 Orange Crush uniforms that feature the iconic royal blue "D" helmets.

In the 2024 NFL draft, the Broncos selected Bo Nix with the team's first-round pick to succeed Russell Wilson as the team's quarterback. Nix was named the starter prior to the 2024 NFL season, beating out Zach Wilson and Jarrett Stidham, and becoming the first Broncos quarterback since John Elway in 1983 to start week 1 of his rookie season.

The Broncos started the season 0–2, before winning five of their next six games to get to 5–3. After back-to-back losses against the Baltimore Ravens and Kansas City Chiefs, the team won four straight games to improve to 9–5, marking an improvement over their 8-win campaign the previous season. Despite back-to-back losses to the Los Angeles Chargers and Cincinnati Bengals, the Broncos would defeat the Kansas City Chiefs in week 18 to finish the season with a record of 10–7, their first 10-win season since 2015, and the team's first winning season since 2016. With the victory, the Broncos clinched a playoff spot for the first time since winning Super Bowl 50. In the Wild Card Round of the NFL playoffs, the Broncos lost to the Buffalo Bills 7–31.

The Broncos started the 2025 NFL season 1–2, but rattled off 13 wins over the final 14 weeks of the regular season, including an 11-game winning streak, which tied the longest win streak in franchise history. The Broncos ultimately finished 2025 with a record of 14–3, tying their highest win total in franchise history, and earned the AFC's No. 1 seed in the playoffs. In the Divisional Round of the playoffs, the Broncos defeated the Buffalo Bills 33–30, winning their first playoff game since their Super Bowl 50 winning season, however, two plays before the end of the game, Bo Nix fractured a bone in his ankle, ending his season. In the AFC Championship against the New England Patriots, the Broncos were defeated 7–10.

== Rivalries ==
=== Divisional ===
The Denver Broncos have three AFC West rivals-the Kansas City Chiefs, Las Vegas Raiders, and Los Angeles Chargers. All teams, along with the Broncos, were charter members of the American Football League (AFL), with each team placed in the AFL Western Division, forerunner of today's AFC West. The four teams have played each other twice a year for over 60 years, making the entire division one huge rivalry. The Broncos were barely competitive during the AFL years (1960–69), going a combined 10–49–1 against the Chiefs, Raiders, and Chargers.

==== Kansas City Chiefs ====
The Broncos have had several memorable matchups with the Chiefs, particularly during the years in which John Elway was the Broncos' starting quarterback (1983–98). The Broncos defeated the Chiefs at Arrowhead Stadium in the divisional round of the 1997 NFL playoffs, en route to their first Super Bowl victory. As of the 2024 season, the Chiefs hold a 73–57 series lead over the Broncos, including the aforementioned 1997 divisional playoff game.

==== Las Vegas Raiders ====
Historically, the most heated divisional matchup for Denver is with the Raiders. The rivalry was ignited in its present form in 1977, when the Broncos advanced to their first Super Bowl by defeating the defending champion Raiders in the 1977 AFC Championship. The rivalry intensified in the mid-1990s, when Mike Shanahan was hired as the Broncos' head coach in 1995. Shanahan coached the Raiders in 1988 before being fired four games into the 1989 season. As of the 2024 season, the Raiders hold a 73–56–2 series lead over the Broncos, including 1–1 in the playoffs.

==== Los Angeles Chargers ====
Unlike their record against the Chiefs and Raiders, as of the 2024 season, the Broncos have a winning record against the Chargers, with a 73–57–1 series lead, including 1–0 in the playoffs. The Broncos pulled off one of the largest comebacks in Monday Night Football history, when Peyton Manning led the Broncos from a 24–0 halftime deficit to a 35–24 win at San Diego's Qualcomm Stadium during the 2012 season. The two teams met in the playoffs for the first time on January 12, 2014, at Denver's Sports Authority Field at Mile High, with the Broncos winning 24–17.

=== Conference ===
Aside from the aforementioned AFC West teams, the Broncos have had intra-conference rivalries over the years with the Cleveland Browns, New England Patriots, and Pittsburgh Steelers.

==== Cleveland Browns ====
The Broncos had a brief rivalry with the Browns that arose from three AFC championship matches in 1986, 1987 and 1989. In the 1986 AFC Championship, quarterback John Elway led The Drive to secure a tie in the waning moments at Cleveland Municipal Stadium; the Broncos went on to win in 23–20 in overtime. One year later, the two teams met again in the 1987 AFC Championship at Mile High Stadium. Denver took a 21–3 lead, but Browns' quarterback Bernie Kosar threw four touchdown passes to tie the game at 31–31 halfway through the 4th quarter. After a long drive, John Elway threw a 20-yard touchdown pass to running back Sammy Winder to give Denver a 38–31 lead. Cleveland advanced to Denver's 8-yard line with 1:12 left, but Broncos' safety Jeremiah Castille stripped Browns' running back Earnest Byner of the football at the 2-yard line—a play that has been called The Fumble by Browns' fans. The Broncos recovered it, gave Cleveland an intentional safety, and went on to win 38–33. The two teams met yet again in the 1989 AFC Championship at Mile High Stadium, which the Broncos easily won by a score of 37–21. The Broncos did not win the Super Bowl after any of the championship games where they defeated the Browns, losing by an aggregate of 136–40. As of the 2024 season, the Broncos lead the all-time series 26–7.

==== New England Patriots ====
The Broncos and Patriots met twice annually during the American Football League (AFL) years from 1960 to 1969, and played in the first-ever AFL game on September 9, 1960. Since 1995, the two teams have met frequently during the regular season, including nine consecutive seasons from 1995 to 2003. The teams' first playoff match on January 4, 1987, was John Elway's first career playoff win, while the teams' second playoff match on January 14, 2006, game was the Broncos' first playoff win since Elway's retirement after the 1998 season. The game was also notable for Champ Bailey's 100-yard interception that resulted in a touchdown-saving tackle by Benjamin Watson at the 1-yard line. On October 11, 2009, the two teams met with former Patriots' offensive coordinator, Josh McDaniels as the Broncos' head coach. Both teams wore their AFL 50th anniversary jerseys. The game featured a 98-yard drive in the fourth quarter, with a game-tying touchdown pass from Kyle Orton to Brandon Marshall, followed by an overtime drive led by Orton that resulted in a 41-yard game-winning field goal by Matt Prater. The two teams met in the Divisional round of the 2011 playoffs, with the Patriots blowing out Tim Tebow and the Broncos by a score of 45–10. The Broncos' rivalry with the Patriots later intensified when longtime Indianapolis Colts' quarterback Peyton Manning became the Broncos' starting quarterback from 2012 to 2015. Manning and Patriots' quarterback Tom Brady maintained a legendary rivalry from 2001 until Manning's retirement after the 2015 season. Though Brady dominated Manning in regular season play, winning nine of twelve meetings, Manning won three of five playoff meetings, including the Broncos' 26–16 win in the 2013 AFC Championship and the Broncos' 20–18 win in the 2015 AFC Championship. The two teams next postseason meeting came in the 2025 AFC Championship, where New England defeated Denver 10–7 to advance to Super Bowl LX. As of the 2025 season, the Broncos lead the all-time series 31–25.

==== Pittsburgh Steelers ====
As of the end of the 2024 season, the Broncos and Steelers have met in postseason play eight times, tied with five other pairings for the second-most frequent playoff matchups in NFL playoff history. The Broncos currently own a 5–3 playoff record vs. the Steelers. Perhaps the most memorable postseason matchup occurred in the 1997 AFC Championship, in which the Broncos defeated the Steelers 24–21 at Three Rivers Stadium, en route to their first Super Bowl victory. Eight years later, the Steelers returned the favor at INVESCO Field at Mile High, defeating the Broncos 34–17 in the 2005 AFC Championship, and subsequently won Super Bowl XL. In the Wild Card round of the 2011 playoffs, in a game dubbed The 3:16 game, the Broncos stunned the Steelers 29–23 on the first play of overtime, when quarterback Tim Tebow connected with wide receiver Demaryius Thomas on an 80-yard game-winning touchdown pass. The teams met again in the Divisional round of the 2015 playoffs at Denver, where the Broncos defeated the Steelers 23–16 on their way to a victory in Super Bowl 50. The Broncos lead the all-time series 20–14–1.

=== Historical ===
==== Seattle Seahawks ====
The Broncos had an old rivalry with the Seattle Seahawks, who were members of the AFC West from 1977 to 2001, prior to the Seahawks' move to the NFC West as part of the NFL's 2002 re-alignment. During the 25 years in which the Seahawks resided in the AFC West, the Broncos went 32–18 against the Seahawks, including a loss at Seattle in the 1983 NFL playoffs. Since 2002, the Broncos have won three of five interconference meetings, and the two teams met in Super Bowl XLVIII on February 2, 2014, with the Seahawks winning by a score of 43–8. As of the 2024 season, the Broncos lead the all-time series 35–23.

== Facilities ==
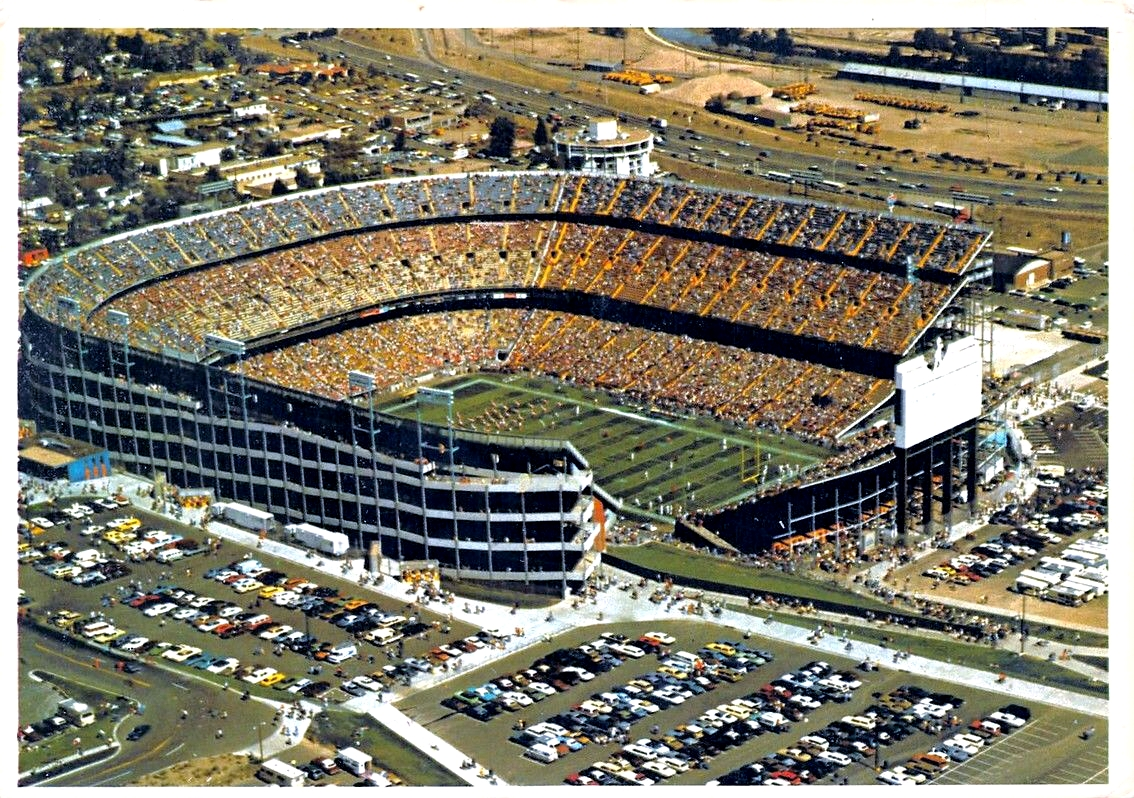
Mile High Stadium was the home of the Broncos from 1960 to 2000

For most of their history, the Denver Broncos played in Mile High Stadium. The AFL Broncos played at the University of Denver's Hilltop Stadium from time to time, including the first victory of an AFL team over an NFL team: The Broncos beat the Detroit Lions on August 5, 1967, in a preseason game. The team has sold out every home game (including post-season games) since the AFL–NFL merger in 1970, with the exception of two replacement games during the 1987 strike (but both were sold out before the strike).

During home games, the attendance is announced to the crowd, along with the number of no-shows (the fans subsequently boo the no shows). The fans are also known to chant "IN-COM-PLETE!" every time the visiting team throws an incomplete pass. The stadium's legendary homefield advantage is regarded as one of the best in the NFL, especially during the playoffs. The Broncos had the best home record in pro football over a 32-year span from 1974 to 2006 (191–65–1). Mile High Stadium was one of the NFL's loudest stadiums, with steel flooring instead of concrete, which may have given the Broncos an advantage over opponents, plus the advantage of altitude conditioning for the Broncos. In 2001, the team moved into then-named Invesco Field at Mile High, built next to the former site of the since-demolished Mile High Stadium. Sportswriter Woody Paige, along with many of Denver's fans, however, often refused to call the stadium by its full name, preferring to use "Mile High Stadium" because of its storied history and sentimental import. Additionally, The Denver Post had an official policy of referring to the stadium as simply "Mile High Stadium" in protest, but dropped this policy in 2004.

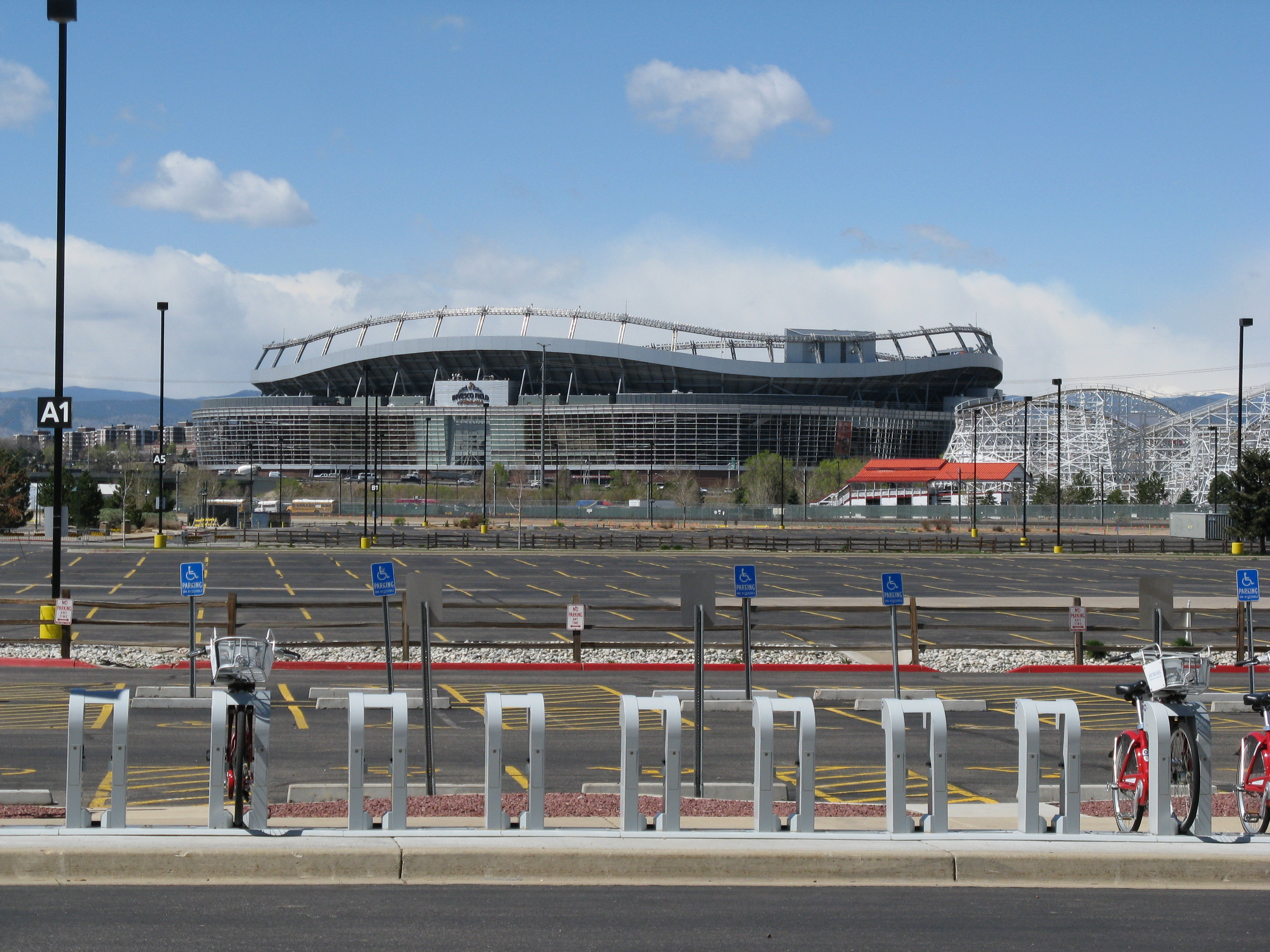
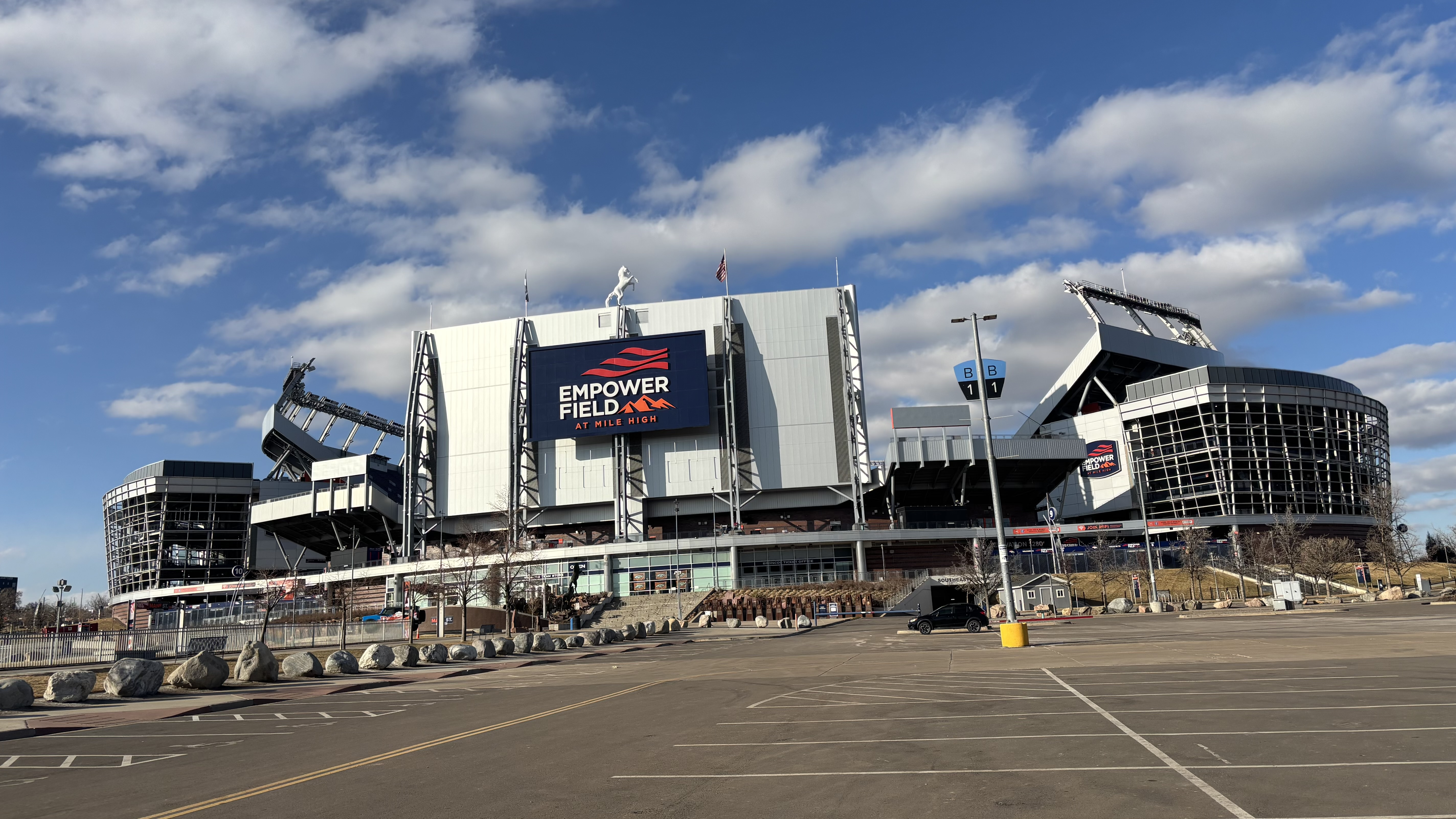
Empower Field at Mile High, the Broncos' home since 2001, as seen in 2011 (left) and 2025 (right)

Prior to the 2011 season, Englewood-based sporting goods retailer Sports Authority claimed the naming rights of Invesco Field, which became known as Sports Authority Field at Mile High. However, in the summer of 2016, Sports Authority went bankrupt, the stadium was renamed Broncos Stadium at Mile High, and the Broncos sought out a naming rights sponsor until September 2019 when they agreed to rename the stadium Empower Field at Mile High.

The altitude has also been attributed as part of the team's home success. The stadium displays multiple references to the stadium's location of 5,280 feet (1.000 mi) above sea level, including a prominent mural just outside the visiting team's locker room. The team training facility, Broncos Park Powered by CommonSpirit (formerly known as the Paul D. Bowlen Memorial Broncos Centre), is a state-of-the-art facility located in Dove Valley. With 13.5 acres (5.5 ha) of property, the facility hosts three full-size fields, a complete weight and training facility, and a cafeteria.

In their more than half-century of existence, the Broncos have never been shut out at home, a streak of over 400 games as of the 2016 season.

In late 2012, the Broncos announced that the stadium would receive $30 million upgrades including a new video board in the south end zone three times larger than the previous display. The renovations were finished before kickoff of the 2013 season.

In September 2025, the Broncos officially designated Burnham Yard, a 58-acre, state-owned former railyard in downtown Denver, as the preferred site for their future stadium, New Broncos Stadium. The plan calls for a privately financed, retractable-roof facility anchored within an expansive mixed-use development featuring retail, hotels, offices, residences, and dynamic public spaces, supported by public infrastructure improvements. The development is scheduled to be completed in time for the 2031 NFL season, coinciding with the expiration of the Broncos’ lease at Empower Field at Mile High.

== Logos and uniforms ==
=== 1968–1996 ===
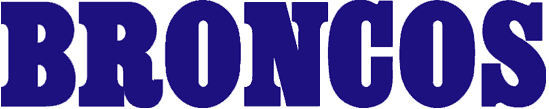
Broncos logo (1997–present) and wordmark (1968–1996)

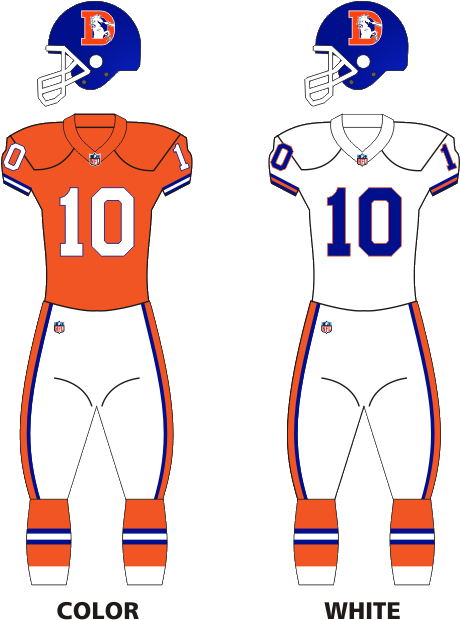
Denver Broncos uniform set from 1967 to 1996. The logo was designed by Edwin Guy Taylor of Denver. A contest was held through Public Service of Denver to come up with a new logo for the team. Taylor's submission was selected late in 1967 and adopted the next season. The team briefly wore orange pants with the away jerseys between 1969 and 1971 and 1978–1979.

When the Broncos debuted in 1960, their original uniforms were said to have drawn as much attention as their play on the field. They featured white and mustard yellow jerseys, contrasting brown helmets, brown pants, and vertically striped socks. Two years later, the team unveiled a new logo featuring a bucking horse and changed their team colors to orange, royal blue and white. The 1962 uniform consisted of white pants, orange helmets, and either orange or white jerseys.

In 1968, the Broncos debuted a design that became known as "Orange Crush". Their logo was redesigned so that the horse was coming out of a "D". Additionally, the helmets were changed to royal blue, and the sleeves had thin stripes with other minor modifications added. From 1969 to 1971, and again from 1978 to 1979, the team wore orange pants with their white jerseys. In 1975, the face masks were changed to white from grey.

The Broncos wore their white jerseys at home throughout the 1971 season, as well as for 1980 home games against the San Diego Chargers and Dallas Cowboys, the latter in hopes to bring out the "blue jersey jinx" which has followed the Cowboys for decades. (The Broncos won 41–20.) The Broncos wore their white jerseys for 1983 home games against the Philadelphia Eagles, Los Angeles Raiders and Cincinnati Bengals, but did not wear white at home again for two decades — see next section.

In 1994, in honor of the 75th anniversary season of the NFL, the Broncos wore their 1965 throwback uniforms for two games—a Week 3 home game against the Raiders and a road game at the Buffalo Bills the following week.

=== 1997–2011 ===
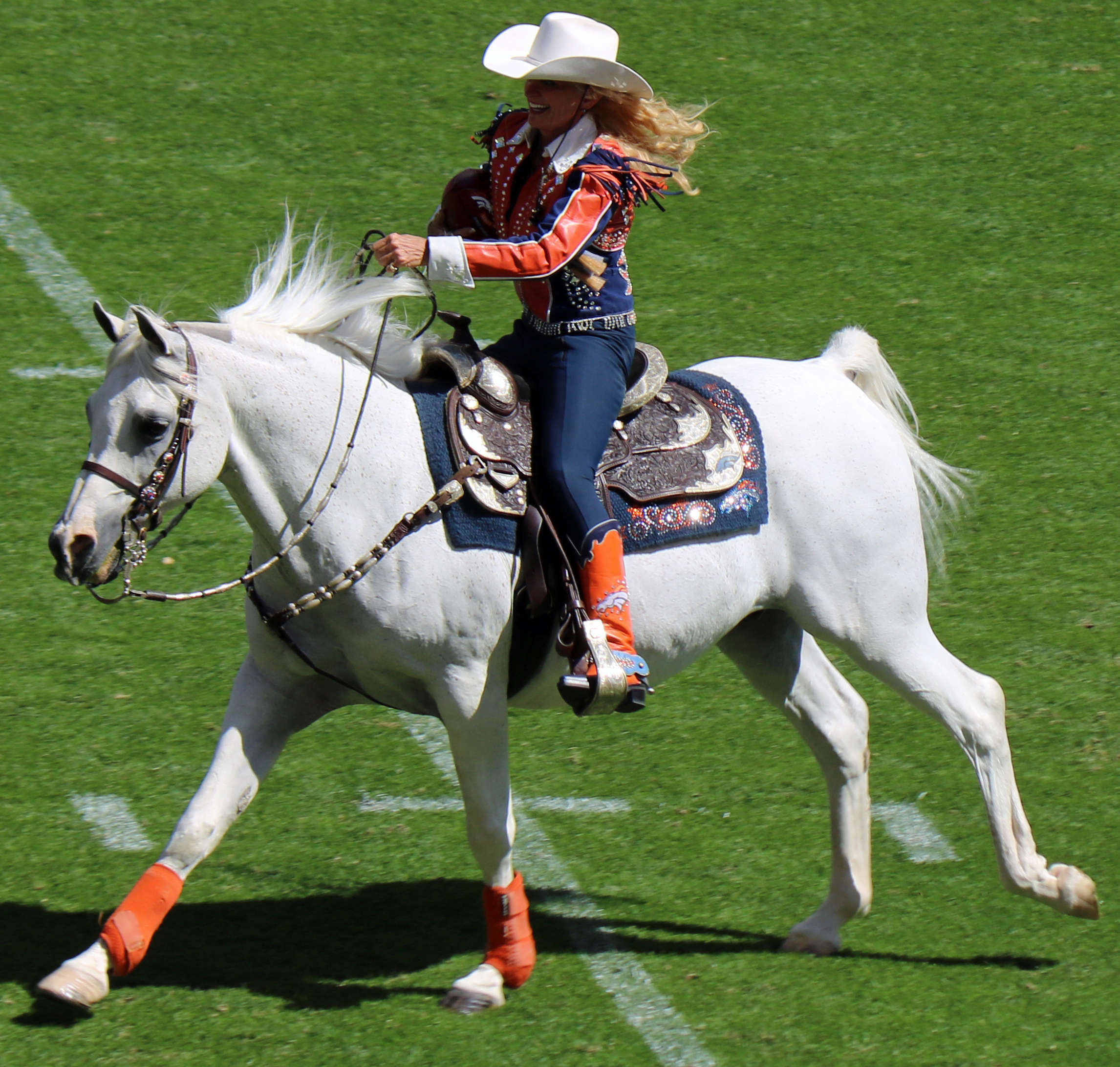
Thunder (mascot)

The Broncos radically changed their logo and uniforms in 1997, a design that the team used until 2023. The new logos and uniforms were unveiled on February 4, 1997. Navy blue replaced royal blue on the team's color scheme. The current logo is a profile of a horse's head, with an orange mane and navy blue outlines. The Broncos' popular live animal mascot Thunder was the inspiration to incorporate a horse-head profile as part of the logo on the team's helmets. During a February 4, 1997, press conference introducing the new logo, the team president and the art director for Nike, who were the creators of the new design, described it as "a powerful horse with a fiery eye and mane."

The Broncos began wearing navy blue jerseys, replacing their longtime orange jerseys that had been the team's predominant home jersey color since 1962. This new uniform design features a new word mark, numbering font and a streak that runs up and down the sides of both the jerseys and the pants. On the navy blue jerseys, the streak is orange, with an orange collar and white numerals trimmed in orange, while on the road white jerseys, the streak is navy blue, with a thin orange accent strip on both sides, a navy collar and navy numerals trimmed in orange; the helmet facemasks became navy blue. When they debuted, these uniforms were vilified by the press and fans, until the Broncos won their first-ever Super Bowl in the new design that same season. The navy blue jerseys served as the team's primary home jersey until the end of the 2011 season — see next section.

In 2002, the Broncos introduced an alternate orange jersey that is a mirror image of the aforementioned navy blue jerseys, but with orange and navy trading places. Like the road white jerseys, the white pants with the navy blue streaks running down the sides are worn with this uniform. This jersey was used only once in the 2002 and 2004 seasons, and were used twice per season from 2008 to 2011. Mike Shanahan, the team's head coach from 1995 to 2008, was not a big fan of the alternate orange jerseys. The Broncos previously wore orange jerseys as a throwback uniform in a Thanksgiving Day game at the Dallas Cowboys in 2001.

The team also introduced navy blue pants in 2003, with orange side streaks to match with the navy blue jerseys. Though they were part of the uniform change in 1997 (in fact, they were worn for a couple of 1997 preseason games) and most players wanted to wear them, the only player who vetoed wearing them was John Elway, thereby delaying their eventual introduction. From 2003 to 2011, these pants were primarily used for select prime-time and late-season home games (excluding the 2008 season), and since 2012, are used exclusively with the now-alternate navy blue jerseys — see next section.

On November 16, 2003, the Broncos wore their white jerseys at home for the first time since 1983, in a game vs. the San Diego Chargers. This was compensation for a uniform mix-up, after the teams' first meeting at San Diego's Qualcomm Stadium in Week 2 earlier that season, when the Chargers were the team that was supposed to declare their uniform color. The Chargers were planning to wear their white jerseys, but the visiting Broncos came to the stadium in white, and were fined $25,000 by the NFL as a result. When the two teams met at INVESCO Field at Mile High later that season (Week 11), the NFL allowed the visiting Chargers to choose their uniform color in advance, and they chose navy blue, forcing the Broncos to wear their white jerseys at home.

In 2009, in honor of their 50th anniversary season as one of the eight original American Football League teams, the Broncos wore their 1960 throwback uniforms (brown helmets, mustard yellow and brown jerseys) for games against two fellow AFL rivals—a Week 5 home game vs. the New England Patriots, as well as the following week at the San Diego Chargers.

=== 2012–2023 ===
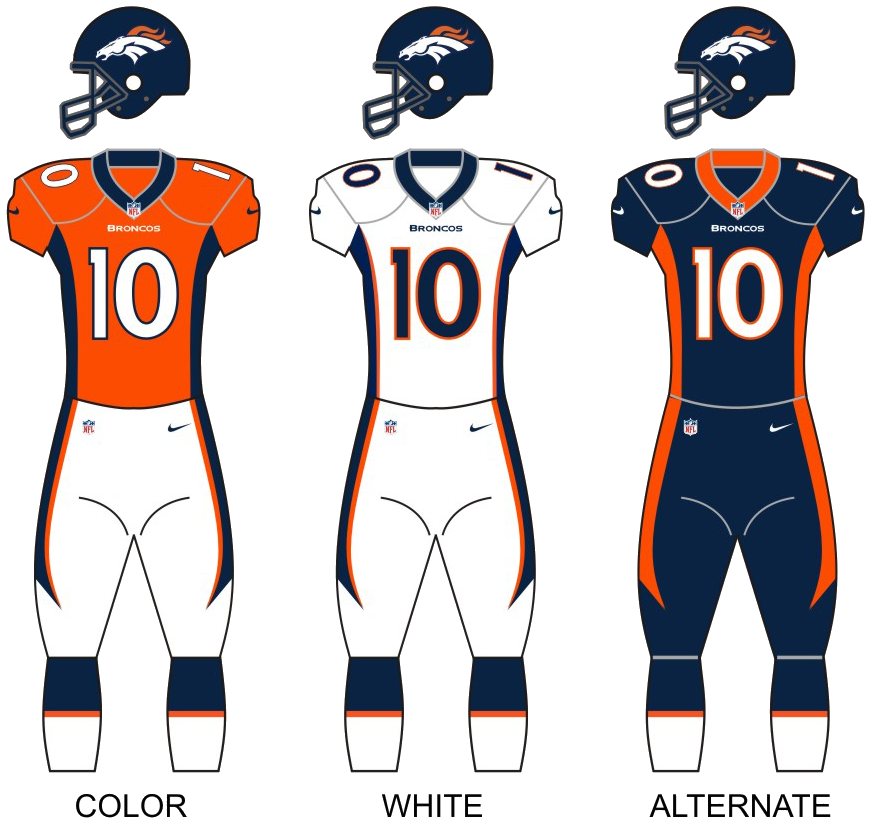
The Denver Broncos uniform set from 1997 to 2023. The navy blue jersey was worn as a primary home jersey from 1997 to 2011 before becoming an alternate jersey in 2012, while the orange jersey was introduced as an alternate in 2002 and became the primary home jersey in 2012. White pants with orange stripes were also worn with the navy blue jersey.

Beginning in 2012, the orange jerseys that served as the alternate colored jerseys from 2002 to 2011 became the primary home jersey, while the navy blue jerseys that served as the primary home jersey from 1997 to 2011 switched to alternate designation. The change was made due to overwhelming popularity with the fans, who pressured the Broncos to return to orange as the team's primary home jersey color. Since the 2012 uniform change, the team has worn the alternate navy blue jerseys for at least one home game per season, with the exception of 2013, in which the Broncos wore their alternate navy blue uniforms for an October 6, 2013, road game at the Dallas Cowboys, which the Broncos won in a shootout, 51–48. The team will either wear the navy blue or the white pants – with the orange side stripes – to match with the alternate navy blue jerseys. The team initially did not wear the white pants with the orange side stripes, until a November 1, 2015, game vs. the Green Bay Packers, in which the Broncos wore said design to match the uniform ensemble that was used during the team's Super Bowl XXXII win over the Packers. On October 30, 2022, the Broncos debuted a new combination of white jerseys and alternate navy blue pants in an NFL London Game at the Jacksonville Jaguars, with mismatched side stripes of navy blue (white jersey) and orange (navy blue pants).

As the designated home team in Super Bowl 50, the Broncos – who have a 0–4 Super Bowl record when using their standard orange jerseys – chose to wear their white jerseys as the designated "home" team.

In 2016, the Broncos' unveiled a new Color Rush uniform, which the team wore for a Thursday Night game at the San Diego Chargers on October 13, 2016. The uniform kit contained the following features: orange pants, which the team wore for the first time since 1979, orange socks and shoes, along with block-style numerals trimmed in navy blue that mirrored the team's 1968–1996 uniform style. Due to the NFL's one-helmet rule implemented in 2013, the helmets remained the same, with the team temporarily replacing the modern primary logo with the throwback "D-horse" logo. The same uniform was used for a Thursday night game against the Indianapolis Colts during the 2017 season and again during a 2018 game against the Pittsburgh Steelers. In a Week 2 game vs. the Washington Commanders in 2023, the Broncos wore their white jerseys at home for the first time since 2003, to honor the 25th anniversary of the Super Bowl XXXIII team. In 2023, the Color Rush uniforms were paired with a white alternate helmet, again using the modernized "D-horse" logo, and were discontinued at the end of that season, with the arrival of a new uniform kit in 2024—see next section.

=== 2024–present ===
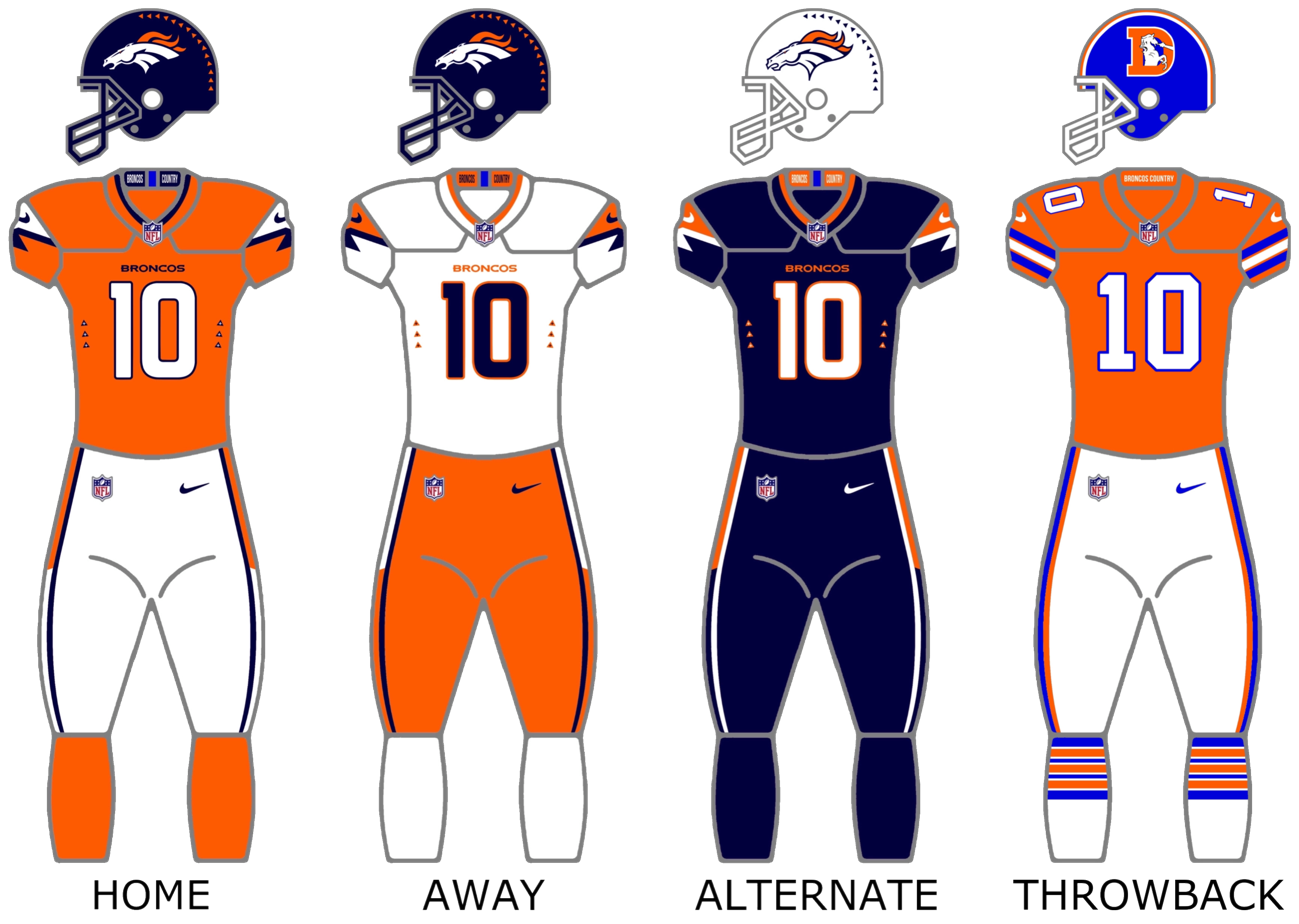
The Denver Broncos uniform set from 2024 to present, known as the "Mile High Collection."

On April 22, 2024, the Broncos unveiled a simpler uniform design, eliminating the mismatched jersey and pant stripes that characterized their 1997 redesign and reverting to a more vintage block number style and letters inspired by the signage of Colorado's national parks. The set consists of a primary home orange and road white uniform, and an alternate navy blue uniform; all uniforms could be worn with either orange, white or navy blue pants. The striping on the uniform is a nod to the Rocky Mountains. The primary helmets remain navy blue while the alternate remains white; both feature the current Broncos logo with triangle clusters on top to represent Denver's elevation. The Broncos also unveiled a throwback 1977 "Orange Crush" uniform along with the royal blue "D-horse" helmet; this is due to the NFL allowing teams with new uniforms to unveil a second alternate helmet this season.

In 2025, after the NFL allowed teams to pair their alternate helmets with the primary uniforms and vice versa, the Broncos took advantage by unveiling two mono-color uniform sets. On September 29, against the Cincinnati Bengals, they paired their all-navy blue alternate uniforms with the primary navy blue helmet. Then on Christmas Day at the Kansas City Chiefs, they wore the all-white uniforms with the alternate white helmet.

== Statistics and records ==
=== Season-by-season records ===
Since their first season in 1960, the Broncos have an all-time record of 518–472–10 as of the 2024 season.

== Players of note ==
=== Current roster ===
Denver Broncos roster
Quarterbacks (QB): 4 Sam Ehlinger; 10 Bo Nix; 8 Jarrett Stidham; Running backs (RB): 20 Jonah Coleman; 27 J. K. Dobbins; 46 Adam Prentice FB; Wide receivers (WR): 13 Pat Bryant; 11 Troy Franklin; 5 Lil'Jordan Humphrey; 19 Marvin Mims RS; 14 Courtland Sutton; 17 Jaylen Waddle; Tight ends (TE): 45 Nate Adkins; 89 Dallen Bentley; 1 Evan Engram; 82 Adam Trautman	Offensive linemen (OL): 72 Garett Bolles T; 78 Kage Casey G; 54 Alex Forsyth C; 69 Mike McGlinchey T; 77 Quinn Meinerz G/C; 63 Alex Palczewski T; 79 Matt Peart T; 74 Ben Powers G; 60 Luke Wattenberg C; Defensive linemen (DL): 99 Zach Allen DE; 94 Jordan Jackson DE; 93 D. J. Jones DT; 95 Sai'vion Jones DE; 98 Tyler Onyedim DT; 97 Malcolm Roach DT	Linebackers (LB): 15 Nik Bonitto OLB; 0 Jonathon Cooper OLB; 47 Karene Reid ILB; 51 Que Robinson OLB; 49 Alex Singleton ILB; 40 Justin Strnad ILB; 92 Dondrea Tillman OLB; 55 Jordan Turner ILB; Defensive backs (DB): 31 Kris Abrams-Draine CB; 6 Tycen Anderson S; 23 Jahdae Barron CB; 9 Talanoa Hufanga S; 22 Brandon Jones S; 26 Devon Key S; 29 Ja'Quan McMillian CB; 21 Riley Moss CB; 34 JL Skinner S; 2 Patrick Surtain II CB; Special teams (ST): 16 Jeremy Crawshaw P; 48 Mitchell Fraboni LS; 3 Wil Lutz K	Practice squad: 53 David Agoha OLB (IPP); 33 Brent Austin CB; 83 Michael Bandy WR; 37 Sean Fresch CB; 81 Kolbe Katsis WR; 87 Dane Key WR; 85 Lucas Krull TE; 90 Jordan Miller NT; 71 Tyler Miller T; 50 Red Murdock ILB; 68 Gavin Ortega G; 41 Jaret Patterson RB; 30 Taylor Rapp S; 25 Cody Schrader RB; 39 Miles Scott S; 76 Calvin Throckmorton G; 59 Johnny Walker Jr. OLB; Reserve: 28 Tyler Badie RB (IR); 56 Levelle Bailey ILB (IR); 73 Frank Crum T (IR/DFR); 67 Michael Deiter C (IR); 52 Jonah Elliss OLB (IR); 66 Nick Gargiulo G (PUP); 12 RJ Harvey RB (IR); 91 Matt Henningsen DE (IR); 84 Caleb Lohner TE (IR/DFR); 96 Eyioma Uwazurike DE (IR) 52 active, 16 practice squad (1 IPP), 10 reserve As of November 11, 2026. Rookies in italics.; Roster; Depth chart; Transactions

=== Retired numbers ===
Denver Broncos retired numbers
No.	Player	Position	Career	Retired
7	John Elway	QB	1983–1998	September 13, 1999
18	Frank Tripucka	QB	1960–1963	1963–2012
18	Peyton Manning	QB	2012–2015 ^{†}	2016 ^{†}
44	Floyd Little	RB	1967–1975	1984

† Note: No. 18 was re-issued for Peyton Manning after Tripucka gave his approval; it was used by Manning from the 2012 season until his retirement after the 2015 season. Manning's name was added to the retired number's banner as an honorable mention.

=== Pro Football Hall of Famers ===
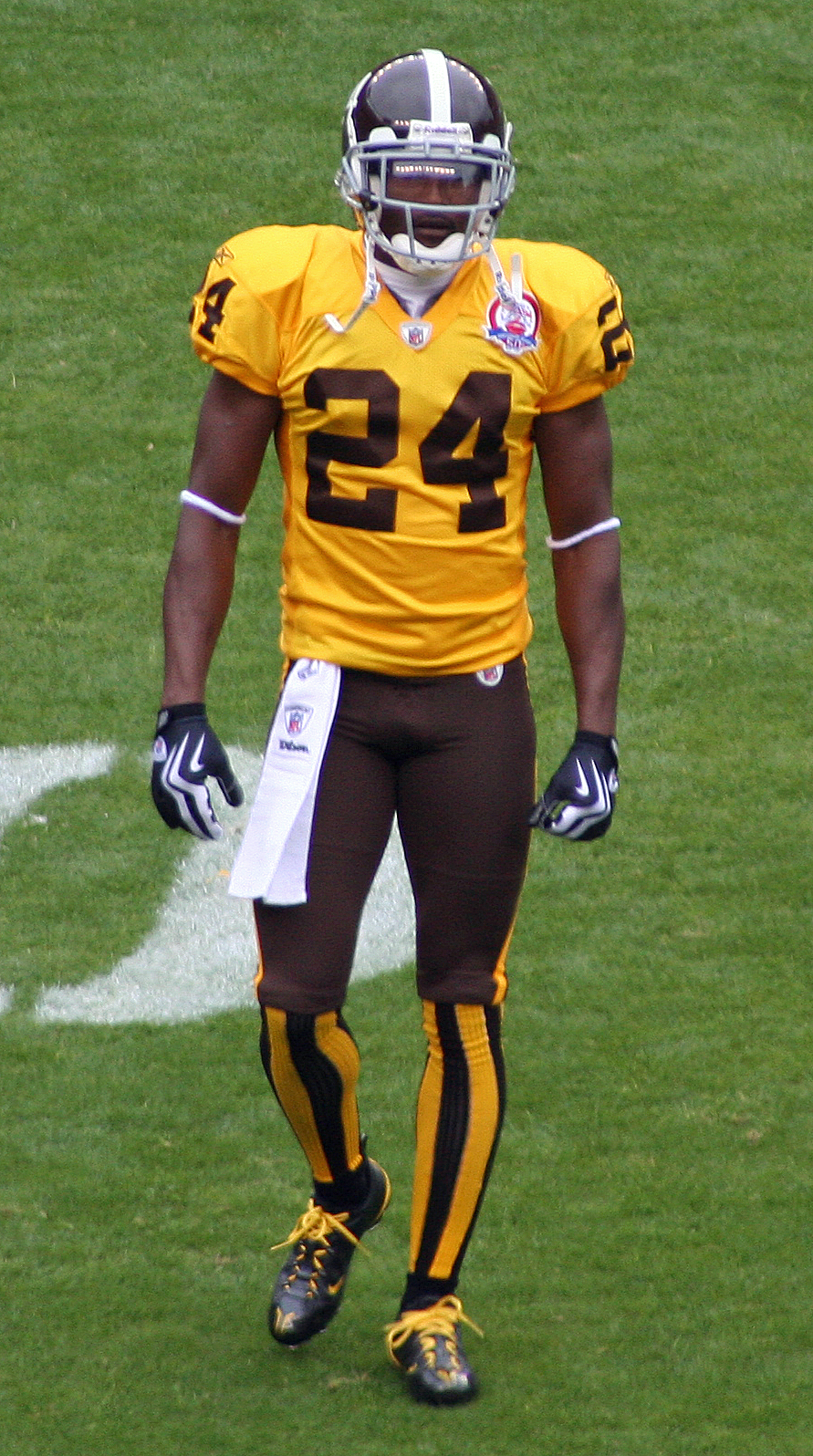
Hall of Fame CB Champ Bailey

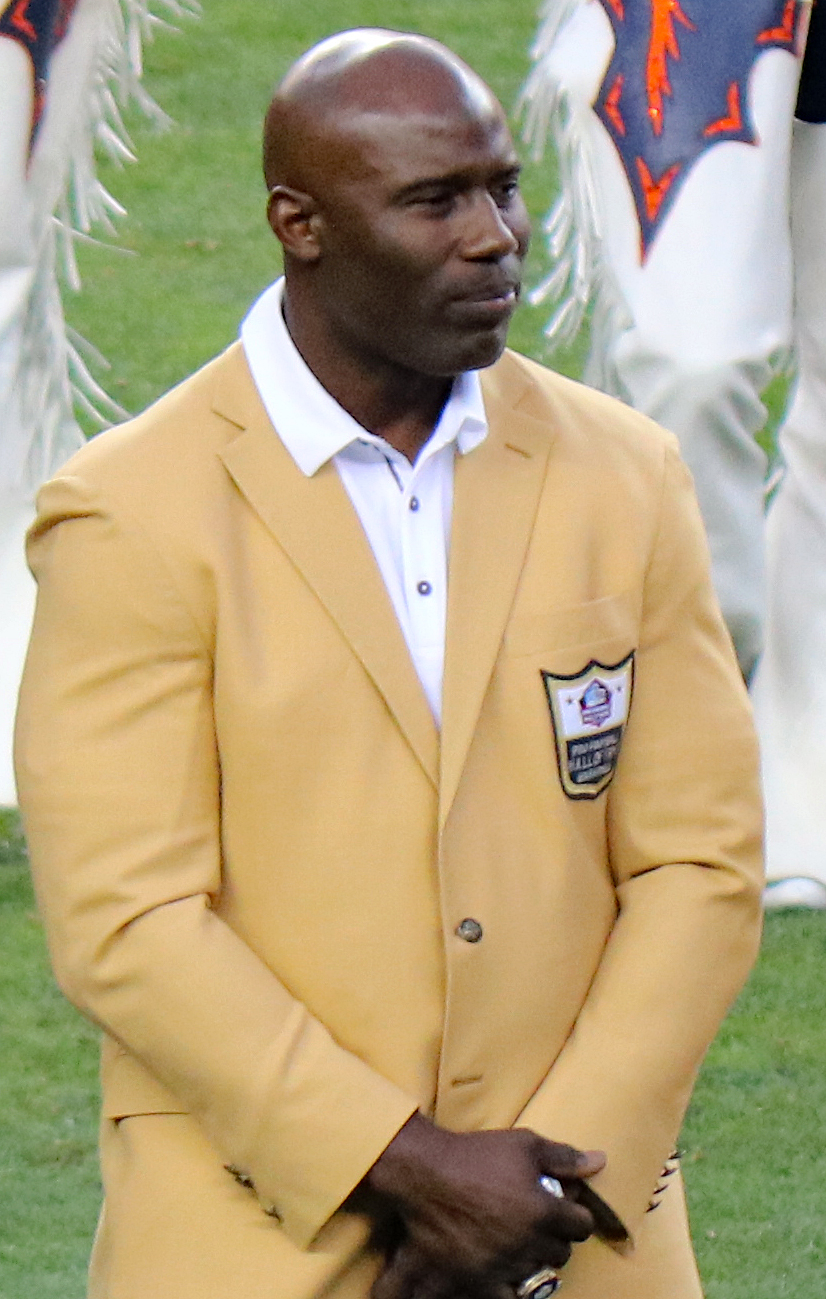
Hall of Fame RB Terrell Davis

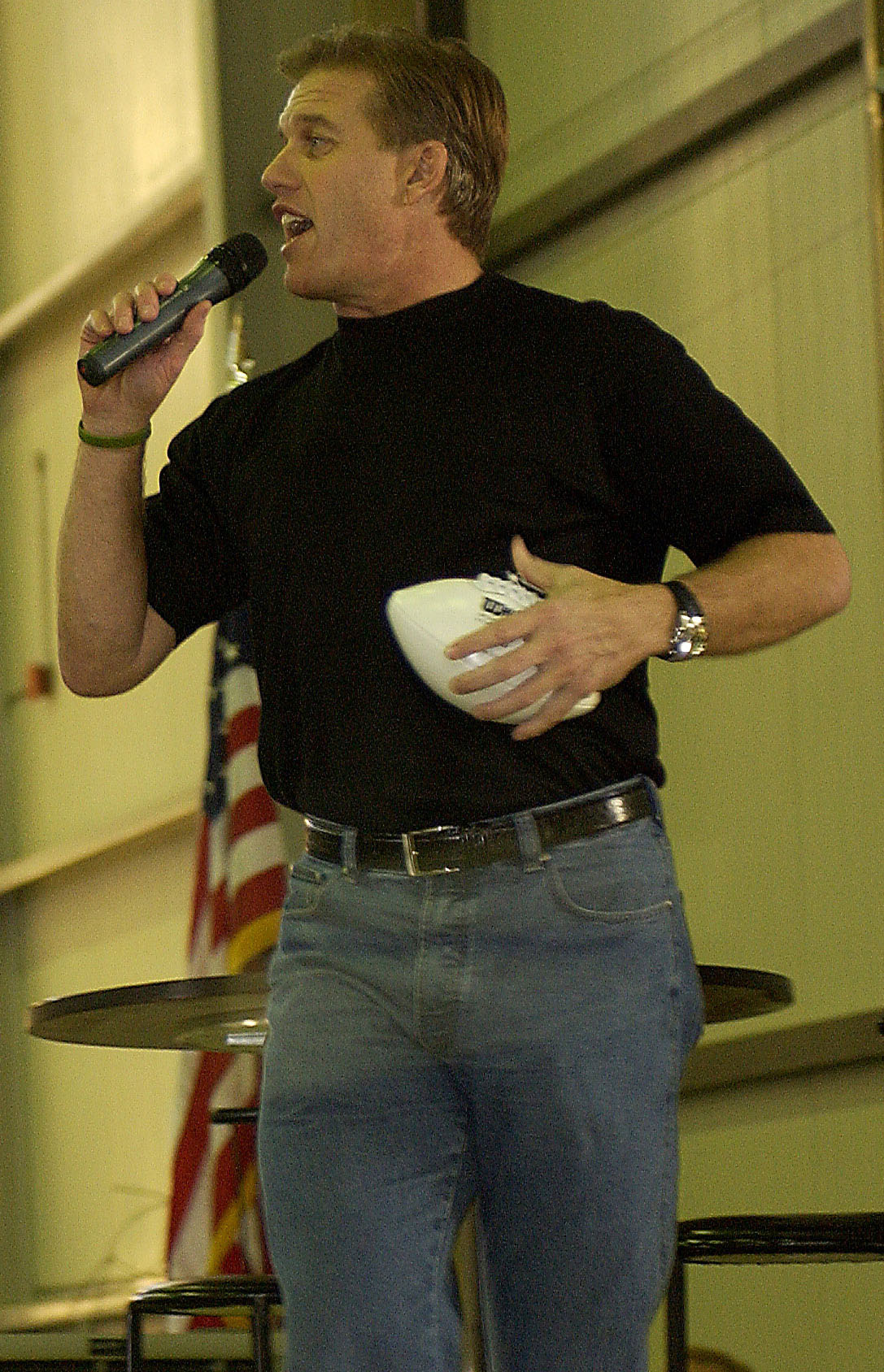
Hall of Fame QB John Elway

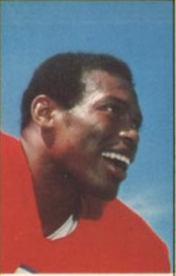
Hall of Fame RB Floyd Little

Denver Broncos Hall of Famers
Players
No.	Name	Position(s)	Season(s)	Inducted
24	Willie Brown	CB	1963–1966	1984
33	Tony Dorsett	RB	1988	1994
7	John Elway	QB	1983–1998	2004
65	Gary Zimmerman	OT	1993–1997	2008
44	Floyd Little	RB	1967–1975	2010
84	Shannon Sharpe	TE	1990–1999; 2002–2003	2011
30	Terrell Davis	RB	1995–2001	2017
20	Brian Dawkins	SS	2009–2011	2018
24	Champ Bailey	CB	2004–2013	2019
26	Ty Law	CB	2009	2019
27	Steve Atwater	FS	1989–1998	2020
47	John Lynch	SS	2004–2007	2021
18	Peyton Manning	QB	2012–2015	2021
94	DeMarcus Ware	LB	2014–2016	2023
53	Randy Gradishar	LB	1974–1983	2024
Coaches and Contributors
Name		Position(s)	Season(s)	Inducted
Pat Bowlen		Owner/CEO	1984–2019	2019

=== Ring of Fame ===
The Broncos have a Ring of Fame on the Level 5 facade of Empower Field at Mile High, which honors the following:

Denver Broncos Ring of Fame
No.	Name	Position(s)	Seasons	Inducted
23	Goose Gonsoulin	S	1960–1966	1984
87	Rich Jackson	DE	1967–1972	1984
44	Floyd Little	RB	1967–1975	1984
87	Lionel Taylor	E	1960–1966	1984
—	Gerald Phipps	Owner	1961–1981	1985
12	Charley Johnson	QB	1972–1975	1986
70	Paul Smith	DT	1968–1978	1986
18	Frank Tripucka	QB	1960–1963	1986
36	Billy Thompson	S	1969–1981	1987
7	Craig Morton	QB	1977–1982	1988
25	Haven Moses	WR	1972–1981	1988
15	Jim Turner	K	1971–1979	1988
53	Randy Gradishar	LB	1974–1983	1989
57	Tom Jackson	LB	1973–1986	1992
20	Louis Wright	CB	1975–1986	1993
7	John Elway	QB, General manager	1983–1998; 2011–2020	1999
77	Karl Mecklenburg	LB	1983–1995	2001
49	Dennis Smith	S	1981–1994	2001
65	Gary Zimmerman	OT	1993–1997	2003
27	Steve Atwater	S	1989–1998	2005
30	Terrell Davis	RB	1995–2001	2007
84	Shannon Sharpe	TE	1990–1999, 2002–2003	2009
80	Rod Smith	WR	1994–2006	2012
66	Tom Nalen	C	1994–2007	2013
21	Gene Mingo	HB, K	1960–1964	2014
—	Dan Reeves	Head coach	1981–1992	2014
80	Rick Upchurch	WR, PR, KR	1975–1983	2014
—	Pat Bowlen	Owner	1984–2013	2015
1	Jason Elam	K	1993–2007	2016
73	Simon Fletcher	LB	1985–1995	2016
47	John Lynch	S	2004–2007	2016
—	Red Miller	Head coach	1977–1980	2017
24	Champ Bailey	CB	2004–2013	2019
—	Mike Shanahan	Head coach	1984–1987 (WR Coach / QB Coach / Offensive Coordinator); 1989–1991 (QB Coach / Offensive Coordinator); 1995–2008 (Head Coach)	2020
18	Peyton Manning	QB	2012–2015	2021
43	Steve Foley	S	1976–1986	2024
88	Riley Odoms	TE	1972–1983	2024
88	Demaryius Thomas	WR	2010–2018	2025

=== 50th Anniversary Team ===
The Denver Broncos announced the club's 50th anniversary team on September 15, 2009. The anniversary team was voted on by users at DenverBroncos.com from June 6 to September 4, 2009.

Position	Player	Tenure
Offense
QB	John Elway	1983–1998
RB	Terrell Davis	1995–2001
RB	Floyd Little	1967–1975
WR	Ed McCaffrey	1995–2003
WR	Rod Smith	1994–2007
TE	Shannon Sharpe	1990–1999, 2002–2003
OT	Matt Lepsis	1997–2007
OT	Gary Zimmerman	1993–1997
G	Keith Bishop	1980–1989
G	Mark Schlereth	1995–2000
C	Tom Nalen	1994–2008
Defense
DE	Simon Fletcher	1985–1995
DE	Rich Jackson	1967–1972
DT	Trevor Pryce	1997–2005
DT	Rubin Carter	1975–1986
LB	Karl Mecklenburg	1983–1994
LB	Randy Gradishar	1974–1983
LB	Tom Jackson	1973–1986
CB	Champ Bailey	2004–2013
CB	Louis Wright	1975–1986
S	Steve Atwater	1989–1998
S	Dennis Smith	1981–1994
Special teams
K	Jason Elam	1993–2007
P	Tom Rouen	1993–2002
RS	Rick Upchurch	1975–1983

=== Super Bowl MVPs ===
The Broncos have had three players win Super Bowl MVP in franchise history.

Super Bowl MVP Winners
Super Bowl	Player	Position
XXXII	Terrell Davis	RB
XXXIII	John Elway	QB
50	Von Miller	LB

== Staff and head coaches ==
=== Head coaches ===
The Broncos have had 20 head coaches serve in the capacity in franchise history.

=== Current staff ===
Denver Broncos staff
Front office: Owner – Rob Walton; Owner / CEO – Greg Penner; Owner – Carrie Walton Penner; Owner – Mellody Hobson; Owner – Condoleezza Rice; Owner – Lewis Hamilton; President – Damani Leech; General manager – George Paton; Assistant general manager – Reed Burckhardt; Vice president of player personnel – Cody Rager; Co-director of player personnel – Cam Williams; Co-director of player personnel – A. J. Durso; Director of pro personnel – Jordon Dizon; Assistant director of pro scouting – Ty Murphy; Vice president of football operations – Kelly Kleine Van Calligan; Vice president of football administration – Rich Hurtado; Vice president of player development – Ray Jackson; Vice president of football technology and research – Tony Lazzaro; Director of football analytics – Scott Flaska; Director of college scouting – Bryan Chesin; Assistant director of college scouting – Dave Bratten; Senior personnel executive – Roman Phifer; Senior personnel executive – Nick Schiralli; Head coach: Head coach – Sean Payton; Assistant head coach/offensive run game coordinator – Zach Strief; Assistant head coach/special teams coordinator - Darren Rizzi; Offensive coaches: Offensive coordinator – Davis Webb; Offensive pass game coordinator – John Morton; Quarterbacks – Logan Kilgore; Director of game management/assistant quarterbacks – Evan Rothstein; Running backs – Lou Ayeni; Wide receivers – Ronald Curry; Tight ends – Austin King; Offensive line – Chris Morgan; Offensive quality control – JD Johnson; Offensive quality control – Kyle Kempt; Offensive quality control – Willie Snead IV	Defensive coaches: Defensive coordinator – Vance Joseph; Defensive line – Jamar Cain; Inside linebackers – Jeff Schmedding; Outside linebackers – Isaac Shewmaker; Front seven - Michael Wilhoite; Defensive pass game coordinator – Robert Livingston; Defensive backs – Doug Belk; Senior defensive assistant – Joe Vitt; Defensive quality control – Todd Davis; Defensive quality control – Brian Niedermeyer; Special teams coaches: Assistant special teams – Marwan Maalouf; Special teams quality control – Zach Line; coaching operations/support: Assistant to the head coach – Paul Kelly; Strength and conditioning: Vice president of player health and performance – Beau Lowery; Director of strength and conditioning – Shaun Snee; Head strength and conditioning – Dan Dalrymple; Assistant strength and conditioning – Zaviar Gooden; Assistant strength and conditioning – Taylor Porter; → Coaching staff → Front office → More NFL staffs

== In the media and popular culture ==
- Tim McKernan, a.k.a. Barrel Man, began wearing a barrel in 1977 after making a $10 (equivalent to $50 in 2025) bet with his brother, Scott, that by wearing one he could get on television. McKernan won the bet, and the barrel he had painted to look like an Orange Crush soda can became his signature costume, and resulted in him becoming one of the Broncos' most recognized fans and a popular mascot. McKernan died on December 5, 2009.
- The animated television show South Park, set in Park County, often mentions the Denver Broncos; show creators Trey Parker and Matt Stone both grew up in Colorado as devout Broncos fans.
- In The Simpsons season 5 episode Cape Feare, when the family are to be given new identities, Homer imagines himself as John Elway, scoring a (consolation) touchdown against San Francisco. Conversely, in the 1996 episode "You Only Move Twice", Hank Scorpio gives Homer Simpson the Denver Broncos as a thank-you gift for helping him. However, Homer complains that he wanted to own the Dallas Cowboys, as the Broncos team that just arrived are playing very sloppy football on his front lawn (a reference to the team losing four Super Bowl appearances, three by significant margins including Super Bowl XII against Dallas). Incidentally, the Broncos were 13–3 in the 1996 season, and won the Super Bowl the next two seasons. Only two seasons later in the Super Bowl-centric episode "Sunday, Cruddy Sunday", Homer chooses Denver as his Super Bowl XXXIII pick over Moe's choice of the Atlanta Falcons. In the episode, "The Bonfire of the Manatees", Homer picks the Broncos to win the Super Bowl over the Seattle Seahawks. The two teams later did play against each other in Super Bowl XLVIII which aired on Fox, the U.S. home of The Simpsons; but the result was a Seahawks victory instead.
- In the 1979 Mork & Mindy episode "Hold That Mork", Mork's character, played by Robin Williams, became the first male cheerleader in Broncos' history. As a member of the "Pony Express", he trotted out on the field at Mile High Stadium during an actual Broncos' game vs. the New England Patriots on November 11, 1979. The episode aired exactly two weeks later.
- Many former Broncos are now in broadcasting, including Shannon Sharpe, Mark Schlereth, Alfred Williams, Tom Jackson, Ed McCaffrey, Brian Griese, David Diaz-Infante, Terrell Davis and Brandon Stokley. Some former Broncos work in radio, KKFN and KDFD in Denver, Colorado.
- Former tight end and wide receiver Nate Jackson has written and published two nonfiction books, Slow Getting Up and Fantasy Man. His writing about the NFL has appeared in Slate, Deadspin, The Daily Beast, The New York Times, The Wall Street Journal, and BuzzFeed, among others. Jackson also co-hosts the Caveman Poet Society.
- Following the 2025 global release of the mobile game for Umamusume: Pretty Derby, a franchise centered around horse girls named after and based on mainly Japanese racehorses, the team gained an added social media presence from fans related to Umamusume including from fans who attended Broncos games while also cosplaying Umamusume characters. In 2026, an official collaboration starring the franchise's personifications of Gold Ship and Mejiro McQueen was announced for the Week 13 home game against the Dolphins.

== Radio and television ==
The Broncos' flagship radio station is currently KOA, 850AM, a 50,000-watt station owned by iHeartMedia. Dave Logan is the play-by-play announcer, with former Broncos' wide receiver Ed McCaffrey serving as the color commentator beginning in 2012, replacing Brian Griese. Ed McCaffrey was replaced by Rick Lewis. Until 2010, preseason games not selected for airing on national television were shown on KCNC, channel 4, which is a CBS owned-and-operated station, as well as other CBS affiliates around the Rocky Mountain region. On May 26, 2011, the Broncos announced that KUSA channel 9, an NBC affiliate also known as 9NEWS in the Rocky Mountain region, will be the team's new television partner for preseason games.

In 2011, the Broncos began a partnership with KJMN, 92.1 FM, a leading Spanish language radio station owned by Entravision Communications (EVC). The partnership also includes broadcasting rights for a half-hour weekly TV show on KCEC, the local Univision affiliate operated by EVC.

== Notes ==
Preceded by Green Bay Packers	Super Bowl champions 1997 (XXXII), 1998 (XXXIII)	Succeeded by St. Louis Rams
Preceded by New England Patriots	Super Bowl champions 2015 (50)	Succeeded by New England Patriots
