= Rob Walton =

American businessman (born 1944)

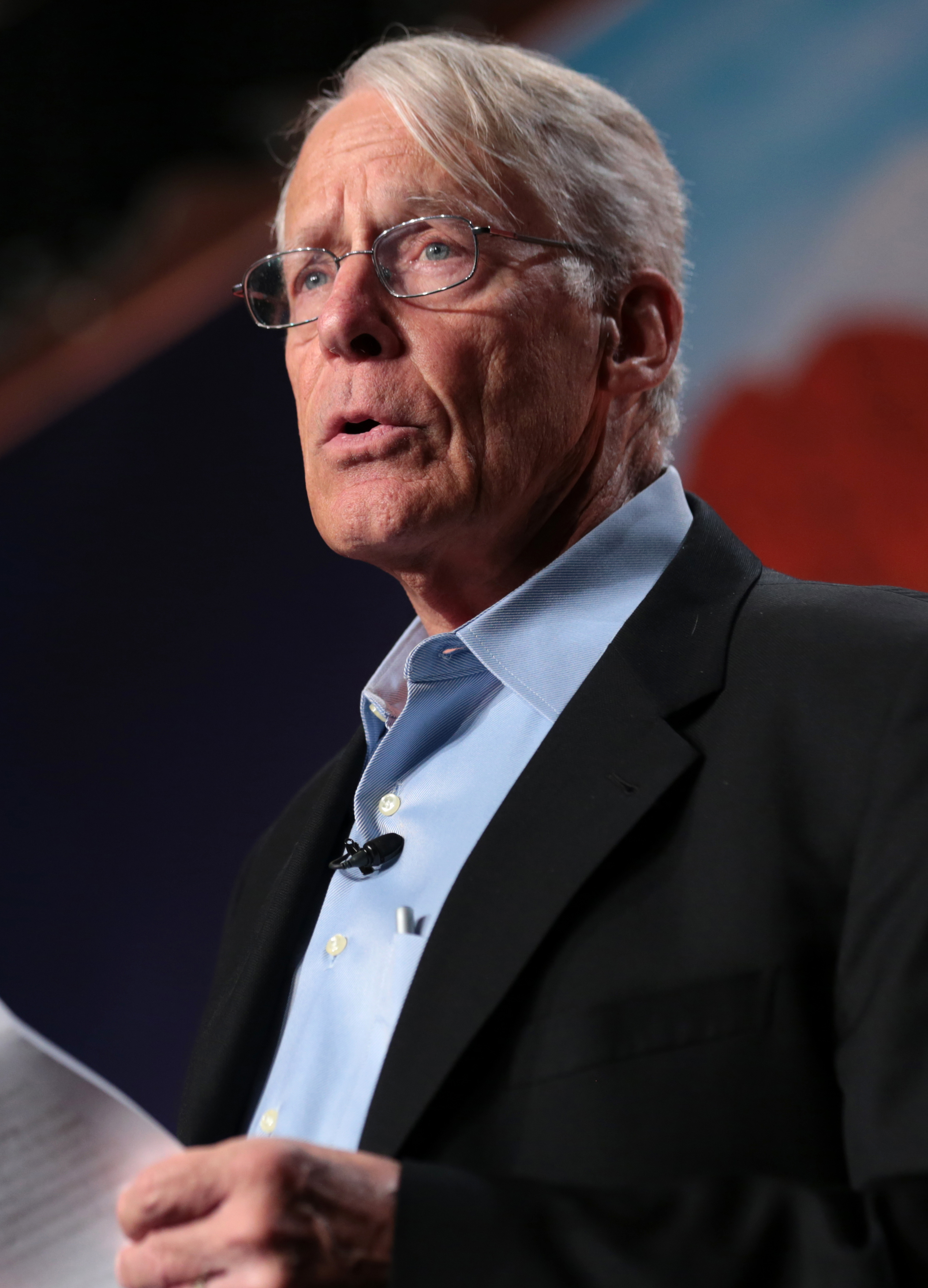
- Walton in 2017
- Born: Samuel Robson Walton; October 27, 1944 (age 82); Tulsa, Oklahoma, U.S.
- Education: University of Arkansas (BS); Columbia University (JD)
- Known for: Walton family fortune
- Title: Former chairman of Walmart (1992–2015)
- Spouses: Carolyn Funk; Melani Lowman (m. 2005)
- Children: 3, including Carrie
- Parents: Sam Walton (father); Helen Walton (mother)
- Relatives: John T. Walton (brother); Jim Walton (brother); Alice Walton (sister); Kelly Rohrbach (niece-in-law); Ann Walton Kroenke (cousin)

Samuel Robson Walton (born October 27, 1944) is an American billionaire heir to the fortune of Walmart, the world's largest retailer. He is the eldest son of Helen Walton and Sam Walton, and was chairman of Walmart from 1992 to 2015. As of February 2026, Forbes estimated his net worth to be US$145.1 billion, making him the 11th richest person in the world. He is also the principal owner of the Denver Broncos.

== Early life and family ==
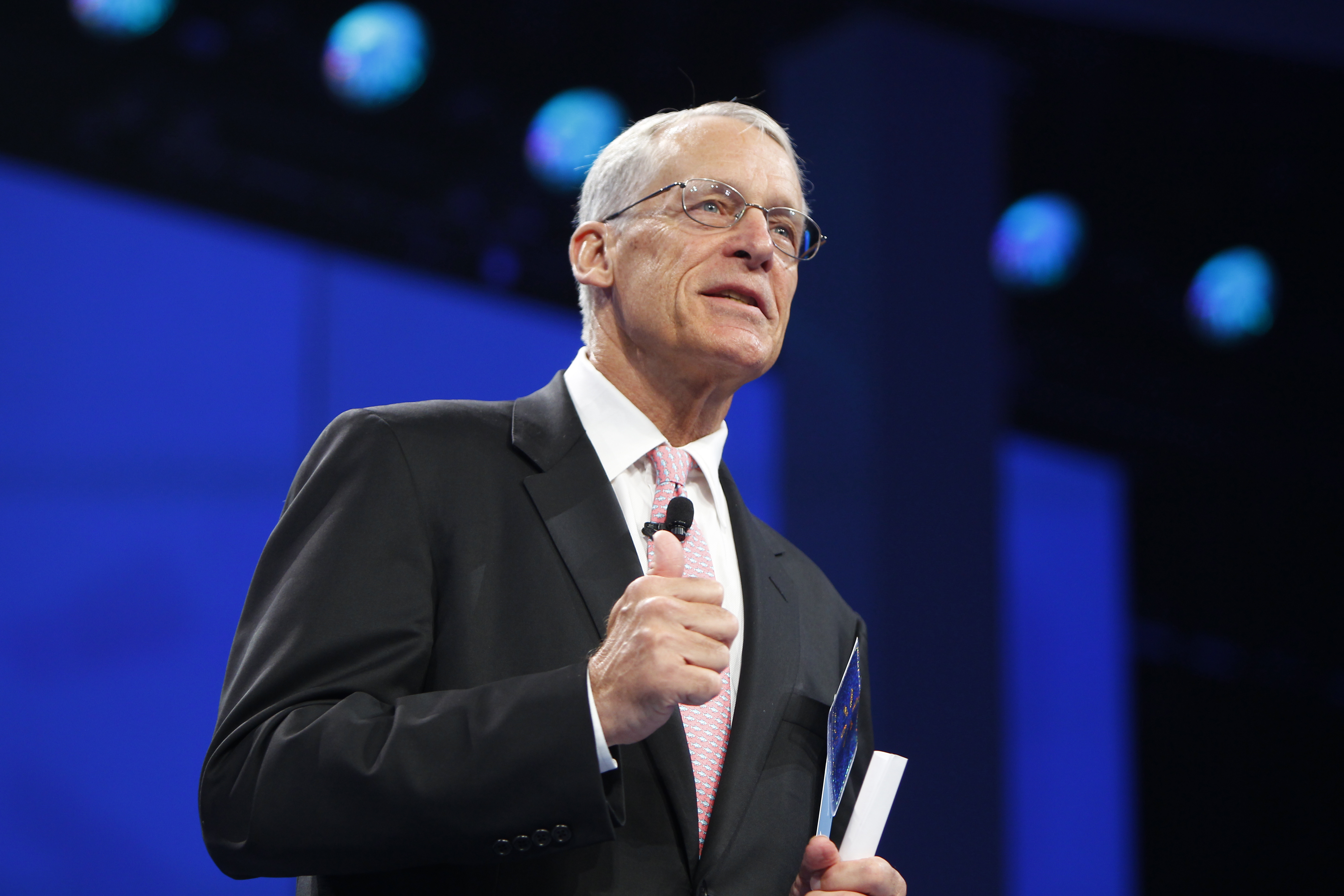
Walton in 2011

Rob Walton was born on October 27, 1944, in Tulsa, Oklahoma, the oldest of four children of Sam Walton (1918–1992), cofounder of Walmart, and Helen Walton (1919–2007). He has a younger brother, Jim Walton, and a younger sister, Alice Walton. Another brother, John Walton, died in 2005.

Walton attended The College of Wooster and graduated from the University of Arkansas in 1966 with a Bachelor of Science degree in business administration, where he was a member of the Lambda Chi Alpha fraternity. He received his juris doctor degree from Columbia Law School in 1969. Walton is also a trustee at The College of Wooster.

After graduation, Walton became a member of the law firm Conner & Winters in Tulsa, Oklahoma, which represented Walmart. In 1978, he left Tulsa to join Walmart as a senior vice president, and in 1982, he was appointed vice chairman. He was named chairman of the board of directors on April 7, 1992, two days after his father's death.

Along with his siblings, he has pledged about $2 billion to the Walton Family Foundation from 2008 to 2013.

On June 7, 2022, an ownership group led by Walton entered into an agreement to purchase the Denver Broncos from the estate of Pat Bowlen for $4.65 billion, which set the record for the most expensive sale of a sports franchise in history, subject to approval from the NFL's finance committee and a 3/4 majority of the full NFL ownership group. Former Secretary of State Condoleezza Rice was announced as added to the ownership group on July 11, 2022. The family then announced on August 2, 2022, that Lewis Hamilton would be added to the ownership group. Walton delegated most day-to-day authority to his son-in-law and successor as Walmart chairman, Greg Penner, who took over as CEO of the franchise and the public face of the ownership group.

== Political activity ==
Walton spent over $17.6 million in support of Republican candidates in the 2024 United States elections. As of August 2026, Walton spent $11 million in support of Republican candidates in the 2026 United States elections.

== Personal life ==
By the time he left Tulsa in 1978, Walton had three children, was divorced from his first wife, and had remarried to Carolyn Funk. He and Carolyn filed for divorce in 2000. He married his third wife Melani Lowman-Walton in 2005. His children include Carrie Walton Penner.

Walton is a well-known collector of automobiles.

Sporting positions
Preceded by Pat Bowlen's Trust	Denver Broncos principal owner 2022–present Served alongside: Greg Penner	Incumbent
