= American Federation for Children Growth Fund =

American school choice promoters

- Company type: Private
- Founded: 2004
- Headquarters: Dallas, Texas, U.S.
- Area served: North America
- Key people: William Oberndorf, chairman
- Website: afcgrowthfund.org

The American Federation for Children Growth Fund (AFCGF), which originally referred to itself as the Alliance for School Choice, is the largest organization in the United States promoting school choice programs. AFCGF supports the creation and expansion of school voucher, corporate tax credit, and other school choice programs. The organization is headquartered in Dallas, Texas, is designated as a 501(c)(3) nonprofit organization, and receives its funding through private individual and foundation donations.

William Oberndorf is the chair of the AFCGF board, as of 2023, and Tommy Schultz is the organization's CEO.

== History ==
AFGG, under its original name the Alliance for School Choice, was launched on May 17, 2004, on the fiftieth anniversary of the Supreme Court decision Brown v. Board of Education, with headquarters in Phoenix, Arizona. The formation of the Alliance for School Choice represented the merger of three organizations: the American Education Reform Council, Children First America, and the American Education Reform Foundation.

Clint Bolick was appointed as the Alliance's first president in 2004. Bolick resigned his position at the Alliance in 2007 to take a new post at the Arizona-based Goldwater Institute. Charles R. Hokanson Jr., a former official at the U.S. Department of Education, served as the organization's president from 2007-2008.

== Activities ==
AFCGF has several initiatives, including Black Minds Matter, a national movement to celebrate Black minds, support excellence, and promote the development of high-quality school options for Black students. They encourage and empower elected officials, community members and families to be innovative, demand excellence in education, and increase the number of schools founded by Black individuals. Black owned school directory is the first-ever online directory to promote schools founded by African Americans.

La Federación Americana para Los Niños is a project that focuses on outreach to Hispanic families.

AFC's Future Leaders Fellowship is designed to identify and develop new leaders in the educational choice movement. It is a twelve-month advocacy training program for graduates of publicly created K-12 school choice programs.

== Activities ==
AFCG shares offices, staff and resources with the American Federation for Children (once called "Advocates for School Choice") which is a 501(c)(4) organization that promotes school choice programs.

AFCGF activities include assisting affiliate organizations in states, hosting informational events, working with parent activists and community leaders to enact and implement state programs, and publishing two magazines, the School Choice Digest and the Activist. The Alliance has also engaged in litigation efforts.

== See also ==
- Bradley Foundation
- Carrie Walton Penner
- Charter School Growth Fund
- The Heritage Foundation
