= Charter School Growth Fund =

American nonprofit philanthropic venture capital fund

- Type: Private
- Industry: Philanthropic venture capital
- Founded: 2006
- Headquarters: Broomfield, Colorado, U.S.
- Area served: North America
- Website: chartergrowthfund.org

The Charter School Growth Fund (CSGF) is a Broomfield, Colorado-based nonprofit philanthropic venture capital fund.

== Funding ==
In 2011, CSGF received a $1.25 million grant from the Bill and Melinda Gates Foundation. Between 2001 and 2010, CSGF has received annual grants from the Bradley Foundation which totalled $16.5 million. The foundation increased their support to $3 million in 2012. CSGF also received $101.6 million from the Walton Family Foundation.

== Investments ==
Dreambox Learning was acquired by CSGF in 2010. Dreambox was heavily funded through venture capital contributed by Reed Hastings, John Doerr, Deborah Quazzo (founder and managing partner at GSV Advisors), and GSV Capital.

CSGF invested heavily in the growth of IDEA Public Schools in Texas despite their inadequate internal accounting controls, improper financial oversight, unethical leadership decisions including documented self-dealing, and the misappropriation of public and private funds that were earmarked for student needs.

== Governance ==
- Kevin Hall, CEO.
- John J. Fisher, manages Pisces, Inc., the Fisher family's investment portfolio (Fisher is a son of the Gap founders) majority owner of the Oakland As, and chairman of the KIPP Foundation, the nation’s largest charter school management company.
- James Rahn, president of the Kern Family Foundation founder of the nonprofit Educational Enterprises Inc. (EEI), a Wisconsin-based organization
- The Charter School Growth Fund's board of directors includes business and philanthropic leaders including Allan Golston of the Gates Foundation, and Nicole Pullen Ross of Goldman Sachs.

== See also ==
- Alliance for School Choice
- Bradley Foundation
- Broad Foundation
- DreamBox (company)
- Rocketship Education
- Walton Foundation
