= Walton Family Foundation =

Nonprofit organization in Bentonville, United States

- Formation: 1987; 39 years ago
- Founders: Sam Walton; Helen Walton
- Founded at: Bentonville, Arkansas, US
- Type: Nonprofit
- Legal status: Foundation
- Purpose: Philanthropy supporting environmental and education causes, and economic development in Northwest Arkansas and the Arkansas-Mississippi delta.
- Location(s): Bentonville, Arkansas; Denver, Colorado; Jersey City, New Jersey; Washington D.C.
- Executive Director: Stephanie Cornell
- Board of directors: Alice Proietti (chairwoman), Carrie Walton Penner, Lukas Walton, Tom Walton
- Website: waltonfamilyfoundation.org

The Walton Family Foundation is an American private foundation and the main philanthropic organization of the Walton family. It was created in 1987 by Walmart founder Sam Walton and his wife Helen Walton. As of 2023, the foundation's giving focuses on environmental and educational causes, as well as supporting communities in Northwest Arkansas and the Arkansas-Mississippi Delta. The board of directors includes four members of the Walton family, and Stephanie Cornell serves as the foundation's executive director.

== Overview ==
Sam and Helen Walton created the Walton Family Foundation in 1987 with $1,000. Upon Sam Walton's death in 1992, he gave the foundation $172 million through a trust. The foundation focuses on education (including charter schools), environmental conservation, and supporting communities in its home region, which it defines as Northwest Arkansas and the Delta region of Arkansas and Mississippi. The foundation has offices in Bentonville, Arkansas, Denver, Colorado, Jersey City, New Jersey, and Washington D.C.

=== Leadership ===
In February 2016, the Waltons decided to downsize the foundation's board from 22 to a few members of the family. As of 2023, the board members are: Annie Proietti (chairwoman), Carrie Walton Penner, Lukas Walton, and Tom Walton. In September 2019, Caryl M. Stern succeeded Kyle Peterson as the foundation's executive director, effective January 2020. Stern announced she was leaving the foundation in October, 2022. She was succeeded by Stephanie Cornell.

== Funding and activities ==
In its first 30 years (1987 to 2017), the Walton Family Foundation granted $6.2 billion to approximately 6,300 grantees. Early efforts of the foundation included a scholarship program for Central American students to attend U.S. schools and support for single mothers. The foundation's giving increased with the emergence of the third generation of Waltons, and in recent years has sharpened its focus. Walton family members said the extra focus on giving was partly a generational shift. Rob Walton said that he and his siblings had focused heavily on Walmart's growth. However, when the newer generation began involvement in family meetings, Walmart was already a success and they turned their focus to philanthropy. The foundation's philanthropic efforts have mirrored the interests of the individual members of the Walton family. In 2018, the foundation awarded more than $595 million in grants for education, environmental and other causes. The foundation gave a total of $525 million in 2019. In 2020, the foundation said it donated $745.9 million to social and environmental causes. Of that, $342.2 million was awarded to projects outside of the foundation's focus areas. Recipients included universities, Teach for America, and UNICEF. Also in 2020, the foundation launched a $35 million relief fund in response to the COVID-19 pandemic.

Alice Walton founded the Crystal Bridges Museum of American Art in Bentonville, which was built and curated with $1.2 billion from the foundation. Steuart and Tom and Olivia Walton oversaw the development of The Momentary, a contemporary art space of Crystal Bridges, with support from the foundation.

Funding has also included improving Bentonville's infrastructure, $31 million for a food hub in Springdale, Arkansas, and support for the LGBT community.

=== Home region ===
The foundation's work in its home region of Northwest Arkansas and the Arkansas-Mississippi Delta is focused on supporting economic and cultural initiatives, as well as supporting local organizations, and affordable housing initiatives. In 2015, the foundation launched the Northwest Arkansas Design Excellence program to prepare for growth-related public planning challenges in the area by connecting architects and firms that are part of the program with projects it is supporting.

Steuart and Tom Walton have led the foundation in donations to develop Northwest Arkansas' mountain-biking facilities. As of 2019, the Walton Family Foundation had contributed $85 million to trail development in Arkansas.

=== Education ===
In 2016, the foundation launched a plan to spend $1 billion over five years for educational opportunities across the U.S. The money funded school growth, teacher training, and school projects. Later that year, the Walton Family Foundation launched the Building Equity Initiative, with $250 million in financial support to provide charter schools with access to capital to improve accessibility, create and expand their facilities. The foundation awarded $100 million to support K-12 schools in 2018. As part of its five-year strategy announced in 2021, the foundation committed more than $75 million to programs that create job and career pathways for students after graduation. In 2021, the foundation awarded $15 million for the 1954 Project to improve Black leadership in education.

The foundation has also supported research projects on Generation Z’s attitudes towards their education experiences in the wake of the COVID-19 pandemic.

=== Environment ===
The foundation's conservation spending focuses on oceans and sustainable seafood; as well as the preservation of the Colorado and Mississippi rivers, including support for agricultural practices that protect water. Grantmaking has also included funds to protect coastal regions along the Gulf of Mexico.

The foundation released an expanded strategic plan for its environmental program in 2021. In addition to ocean and water conservation remaining a focus for the organization, it emphasized addressing climate change by working with intermediary funds to distribute grants to smaller community groups, expanding agriculture philanthropy, and supporting indigenous communities.

Other recipients of funding from the foundation's environment program have been the Associated Press for environmental journalism, The National Audubon Society, Conservation International, and the World Wildlife Fund.

==== Seafood sustainability ====
In 2016, the foundation committed $250 million to marine conservation. It initially focused on the US, Japan, and Spain as markets with a high demand for seafood, and on five of the top seafood producing countries, Indonesia, the United States, Mexico, Chile and Peru. The program was aimed at improving systems to support community fishing rights, rebuilding fish stocks, and building policies and markets for sustainably harvested seafood. In 2021, the foundation released an expanded plan that included a greater focus on specific commodities, and expanded its market focus to include the entire European Union.

==== River conservation ====
The foundation's conservation spending has included funds to protect the Colorado River and the coastal regions along the Gulf of Mexico. It gave approximately $200 million to charities, universities, and media outlets working on water issues around the Colorado river between 2011 and 2021. The Foundation’s work in the space has focused on ending overuse of the Colorado River across the West. This has included research and efforts to advance a water market system – where water is traded as a commodity – as a means of conserving the river. The foundation said it has pivoted away from water markets to focus on reducing the amount of water removed from the river, watershed health, forest restoration, and sustainable fisheries.
