= 2026 Denver Broncos season =

American football team season

- Owner: Rob Walton (Note: Other members of the ownership group include Carrie Walton Penner, Greg Penner, Mellody Hobson, Condoleezza Rice, and Lewis Hamilton)
- General manager: George Paton
- President: Damani Leech
- Head coach: Sean Payton
- Offensive coordinator: Davis Webb
- Defensive coordinator: Vance Joseph
- Home stadium: Empower Field at Mile High

Results
- Record: 7–2
- Division place: 2nd AFC West

Uniform
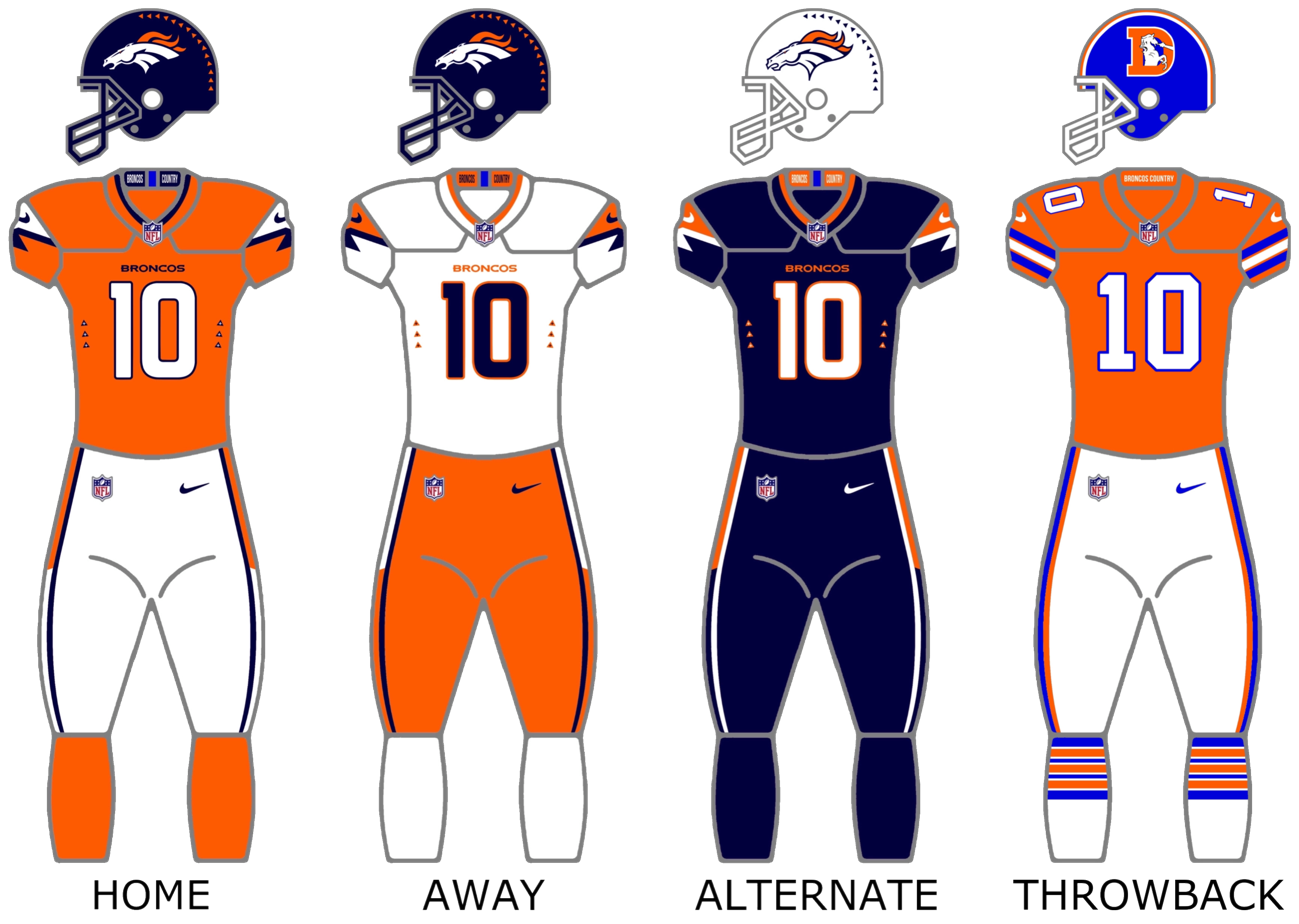

The 2026 season is the Denver Broncos' 57th in the National Football League (NFL) and their 67th overall. It is also the team's sixth under the leadership of general manager George Paton, the fifth under the ownership of the Walton-Penner family group and the fourth under head coach Sean Payton. They will attempt to match or improve on their 14–3 record from 2025, make the playoffs for the third consecutive season, and win the AFC West for the second consecutive season.

== Coaching changes ==
2025 Denver Broncos coaching staff changes
Position	Previous coach	Reason	Replacement(s)	Source(s)
Assistant strength and conditioning coach	Korey Jones, 2020–2025	Contract expired	Zaviar Gooden	
Cornerbacks coach	Addison Lynch, 2025	Fired	Doug Belk (as defensive backs coach)	
Defensive pass game coordinator	Jim Leonhard, 2024–2025	Hired by the Buffalo Bills	Robert Livingston	
Front seven coach	None	–	Michael Wilhoite	
Offensive consultant	John Morton, 2025	Promoted to pass game coordinator	None	
Offensive coordinator	Joe Lombardi, 2023–2025	Fired	Davis Webb	
Offensive line coach	None	–	Chris Morgan	
Offensive pass game coordinator & quarterbacks coach	Davis Webb, 2023–2025	Promoted to offensive coordinator	John Morton (as offensive pass game coordinator)	
Offensive pass game coordinator & quarterbacks coach	Davis Webb, 2023–2025	Promoted to offensive coordinator	Logan Kilgore (as quarterbacks coach)	
Offensive quality control coach	Logan Kilgore, 2023–2025	Promoted to quarterbacks coach	JD Johnson; Kyle Kempt; Willie Snead IV	
Offensive quality control coach	Favian Upshaw, 2023–2025	Hired by the Miami Hurricanes	JD Johnson; Kyle Kempt; Willie Snead IV	
Passing game specialist	Zack Grossi, 2024–2025	Hired by the Baltimore Ravens	None	
Senior offensive assistant	Pete Carmichael Jr., 2024–2025	Hired by the Buffalo Bills	None	
Wide receivers coach	Keary Colbert, 2023–2025	Fired	Ronald Curry	

== Roster changes ==
=== Future contracts ===
All players listed below were signed to reserve/future contracts. Each player was officially added to the active roster on March 11—the first day of the 2026 league year.

Position	Player	Date signed	Source(s)
ILB	Levelle Bailey	January 26	
TE	Caleb Lohner	January 26	
NT	Jordan Miller	January 26	
RB	Cody Schrader	January 26	
G	Calvin Throckmorton	January 26	
RB	Deuce Vaughn	January 26	
OLB	Garrett Nelson	January 27	
T	Marques Cox	January 29	
C	Michael Deiter	January 29	
G	Nash Jones	January 29	
DT	Kristian Williams	January 29	
CB	Jaden Robinson	January 30	

=== Free agents ===
Position	Player	Tag	Team signed with	Date signed	Notes	Source(s)
TE	Nate Adkins	RFA	Denver Broncos	March 10	1 year, $1.555 million	
RB	Tyler Badie	ERFA	Denver Broncos	March 6	1 year, $1.075 million	
FB	Michael Burton	UFA	Cleveland Browns	April 28	1 year, $1.4 million	
RB	J. K. Dobbins	UFA	Denver Broncos	March 10	2 years, $16 million	
QB	Sam Ehlinger	UFA	Denver Broncos	March 11	1 year, $2 million	
DE	John Franklin-Myers	UFA	Tennessee Titans	March 12	3 years, $63 million	
DE	Matt Henningsen	UFA	Denver Broncos	March 11	originally an RFA; 1 year, $1.145 million	
WR	Lil'Jordan Humphrey	UFA	Denver Broncos	March 12	1 year, $1.215 million	
DE	Jordan Jackson	ERFA	Denver Broncos	March 6	1 year, $1.075 million	
S	Devon Key	ERFA	Denver Broncos	March 6	1 year, $1.075 million	
TE	Lucas Krull	UFA	Denver Broncos	March 11	originally an RFA; 1 year, $1.33 million	
S	P. J. Locke	UFA	Dallas Cowboys	March 10	1 year, $5 million	
RB	Jaleel McLaughlin	UFA	Denver Broncos	March 13	originally an RFA; 1 year, $1.145 million	
CB	Ja'Quan McMillian	RFA	Denver Broncos	February 27	1 year, $5.8 million	
C	Sam Mustipher	UFA	Jacksonville Jaguars	August 5	1 year, $1.215 million	
G	Alex Palczewski	RFA	Denver Broncos	March 5	2 years, $9.5 million	
FB	Adam Prentice	UFA	Denver Broncos	March 12	1 year, $1.215 million	
ILB	Alex Singleton	UFA	Denver Broncos	March 10	2 years, $15.5 million	
ILB	Justin Strnad	UFA	Denver Broncos	March 10	3 years, $18 million	
OLB	Dondrea Tillman	ERFA	Denver Broncos	March 6	1 year, $1.075 million	
TE	Adam Trautman	UFA	Denver Broncos	March 9	3 years, $17 million	
Unrestricted Free Agent (UFA): Players with four or more accrued seasons whose contracts expired at the end of the previous season Restricted Free Agent (RFA): Players with three accrued seasons whose contracts expired at the end of the previous season Exclusive-Rights Free Agent (ERFA): Players with two or fewer accrued seasons whose contracts expired at the end of the previous season

=== Signings ===
Position	Player	Previous team	Date signed	Notes	Source(s)
WR	Michael Bandy	Denver Broncos	February 19	1 year, $1.085 million	
S	Tycen Anderson	Cincinnati Bengals	March 19	1 year, $1.5 million	
WR	Michael Woods II	Green Bay Packers	May 12	1 year, $1.075 million	
WR	Hakeem Butler	St. Louis Battlehawks (UFL)	June 16	1 year, $1.005 million	
CB	Sean Fresch	St. Louis Battlehawks (UFL)	June 16	1 year, $0.885 million	
T	Reid Holskey	New York Giants	June 18	1 year, $0.885 million	
CB	Sam Webb	Cleveland Browns	July 31	1 year, $1.215 million	
WR	Kyre Duplessis	Seattle Seahawks	August 7	1 year, $0.885 million	
WR	Kyrese Rowan	Hamilton Tiger-Cats (CFL)	August 8	1 year, $0.885 million	
C	Lecitus Smith	Green Bay Packers	August 13	1 year, $1.145 million	
S	Taylor Rapp	Buffalo Bills	August 20	1 year, $1.3 million	
OLB	Ron Stone Jr.	Columbus Aviators (UFL)	August 25	1 year, $0.885 million	
DT	Israel Antwine	Houston Gamblers (UFL)	August 26	1 year, $0.885 million	
T	Foster Sarell	Washington Commanders	August 26	1 year, $1.215 million	
OLB	David Agoha	Tennessee Titans	August 31	Practice squad	
CB	Brent Austin	Denver Broncos	August 31	Practice squad	
WR	Michael Bandy	Denver Broncos	August 31	Practice squad	
LS	Luke Basso	Denver Broncos	August 31	Practice squad	
LS	Mitchell Fraboni	Denver Broncos	August 31	Practice squad	
CB	Sean Fresch	Denver Broncos	August 31	Practice squad	
WR	Kolbe Katsis	Denver Broncos	August 31	Practice squad	
WR	Dane Key	Denver Broncos	August 31	Practice squad	
TE	Lucas Krull	Denver Broncos	August 31	Practice squad	
T	Tyler Miller	Denver Broncos	August 31	Practice squad	
ILB	Red Murdock	Denver Broncos	August 31	Practice squad	
G	Gavin Ortega	Denver Broncos	August 31	Practice squad	
FB	Adam Prentice	Denver Broncos	August 31	Practice squad	
RB	Cody Schrader	Denver Broncos	August 31	Practice squad	
S	Miles Scott	Denver Broncos	August 31	Practice squad	
G	Calvin Throckmorton	Denver Broncos	August 31	Practice squad	
OLB	Johnny Walker Jr.	Denver Broncos	August 31	Practice squad	
S	Taylor Rapp	Denver Broncos	September 7	Practice squad	
WR	Lil'Jordan Humphrey	Denver Broncos	September 15	1 year, $1.215 million	
LS	Mitchell Fraboni	Denver Broncos	September 26	Promoted to active	
OLB	Jahfari Harvey	Las Vegas Raiders	September 29	Practice squad	
FB	Adam Prentice	Denver Broncos	October 3	Promoted to active	
WR	Lil'Jordan Humphrey	Denver Broncos	October 3	Practice squad	
WR	Cam Ross	Denver Broncos	October 6	Practice squad	
WR	Lil'Jordan Humphrey	Denver Broncos	October 9	Promoted to active	
CB	Ugo Amadi	New York Giants	October 9	Practice squad	
WR	Eli Pancol	Indianapolis Colts	October 27	Practice squad	
S	Taylor Rapp	Denver Broncos	October 31	Promoted to active	
CB	Ugo Amadi	Denver Broncos	November 3	Practice squad	
NT	Jordan Miller	Miami Dolphins	November 3	Practice squad	
RB	Jaret Patterson	Cleveland Browns	November 3	Practice squad	
CB	Sean Fresch	Denver Broncos	November 7	Promoted to active	
S	Taylor Rapp	Denver Broncos	November 7	Practice squad	
CB	Sean Fresch	Denver Broncos	November 13	Practice squad	
S	Taylor Rapp	Denver Broncos	November 21	Promoted to active	

=== Departures ===
Position	Player	Date	Notes	Source(s)
ILB	Dre Greenlaw	March 12	Released/post-June 1	
T	Marques Cox	May 8	Waived	
OLB	Garrett Nelson	May 8	Waived	
RB	Deuce Vaughn	May 12	Waived	
CB	Will Wright	May 12	Waived	
CB	Paul Manning	June 16	Waived	
WR	Michael Woods II	June 16	Waived/injured	
CB	Ahmari Harvey	June 18	Waived	
G	Nash Jones	June 18	Waived	
WR	Michael Woods II	June 24	Waived from IR	
CB	Blake Cotton	July 31	Waived/injured	
CB	Blake Cotton	August 2	Waived from IR	
CB	Jaden Robinson	August 7	Waived	
CB	Sam Webb	August 8	Released	
ILB	Levelle Bailey	August 20	Waived/injured	
WR	Hakeem Butler	August 25	Waived	
WR	Kyre Duplessis	August 26	Waived	
S	Taylor Rapp	August 26	Released	
DT	Israel Antwine	August 30	Waived	
CB	Brent Austin	August 30	Waived	
WR	Michael Bandy	August 30	Waived	
LS	Luke Basso	August 30	Waived	
LS	Mitchell Fraboni	August 30	Released	
CB	Sean Fresch	August 30	Waived	
CB	Ricardo Hallman	August 30	Waived	
T	Reid Holskey	August 30	Waived	
TE	Justin Joly	August 30	Waived	
WR	Kolbe Katsis	August 30	Waived	
WR	Dane Key	August 30	Waived	
TE	Lucas Krull	August 30	Released	
WR	Joseph Manjack	August 30	Waived	
OLB	Dasan McCullough	August 30	Waived	
RB	Jaleel McLaughlin	August 30	Waived	
NT	Jordan Miller	August 30	Waived	
T	Tyler Miller	August 30	Waived	
ILB	Red Murdock	August 30	Waived	
G	Gavin Ortega	August 30	Waived	
FB	Adam Prentice	August 30	Released	
S	Parker Robertson	August 30	Waived	
WR	Cam Ross	August 30	Waived	
WR	Kyrese Rowan	August 30	Waived	
OLB	Drew Sanders	August 30	Waived/injured	
T	Foster Sarell	August 30	Released	
RB	Cody Schrader	August 30	Waived	
S	Miles Scott	August 30	Waived	
C	Lecitus Smith	August 30	Released	
OLB	Ron Stone Jr.	August 30	Waived	
CB	Reese Taylor	August 30	Waived	
G	Calvin Throckmorton	August 30	Released	
OLB	Johnny Walker Jr.	August 30	Waived	
DT	Kristian Williams	August 30	Waived	
ILB	Taurean York	August 30	Waived	
LS	Luke Basso	September 7	Released from PS	
OLB	Drew Sanders	September 8	Waived from IR	
WR	Lil'Jordan Humphrey	September 14	Released	
WR	Lil'Jordan Humphrey	October 2	Released	
OLB	Jahfari Harvey	October 6	Released from PS	
CB	Ugo Amadi	October 27	Released from PS	
WR	Eli Pancol	November 3	Released from PS	
WR	Cam Ross	November 3	Released from PS	
S	Taylor Rapp	November 6	Released	
CB	Ugo Amadi	November 10	Released from PS	
CB	Sean Fresch	November 10	Waived	

=== Extensions and restructures ===
Position	Player	Date signed	Notes	Source(s)
G	Quinn Meinerz	March 8	Restructure	
OLB	Jonathon Cooper	March 13	Restructure	
T	Matt Peart	March 18	Restructure	
WR	Jaylen Waddle	March 24	Restructure	
CB	Patrick Surtain II	June 2	Restructure	
G	Ben Powers	July 27	Restructure	
S	Talanoa Hufanga	November 10	Restructure	
CB	Riley Moss	November 19	4 years, $67 million	

=== Trades ===
Trade partner	Broncos give	Broncos receive	Date	Source(s)
Miami Dolphins	2026 first-round selection 2026 third-round selection 2026 fourth-round selection	WR Jaylen Waddle; 2026 fourth-round selection	March 18	

=== Draft ===
2026 Denver Broncos draft selections
Round	Selection	Player	Position	College	Notes
1	30	Traded to the Miami Dolphins (Note: The Broncos traded their first-, third- and original fourth-round selections to the Dolphins (Nos. 30, 94 and 130 overall, respectively) in exchange for wide receiver Jaylen Waddle and the Dolphins' 2026 fourth-round selection (No. 111 overall).)			
2	62	Traded to the Buffalo Bills (Note: The Broncos traded their original second-round selection (No. 62 overall) to the Bills in exchange for the Bills' third- and sixth-round selections (Nos. 66 and 182 overall, respectively).)			
3	66	Tyler Onyedim	DT	Texas A&M	From Bills
3	94	Traded to the Miami Dolphins			
4	108	Jonah Coleman	RB	Washington	From Saints (Note: The Broncos traded WR Devaughn Vele to the New Orleans Saints in exchange for a fourth-round selection (108th overall) and a 2027 seventh-round selection.)
4	111	Kage Casey	OT	Boise State	From Dolphins
4	130	Traded to the Miami Dolphins			
5	152	Justin Joly	TE	NC State	From Cowboys via 49ers and Browns
5	170	Traded to the Cleveland Browns			
6	182	Traded to the Cleveland Browns			From Jets via Browns, Jaguars and Bills
6	211	Traded to the New York Jets (Note: The Broncos traded their original sixth-round selection (211th overall) to the New York Jets in exchange for DE John Franklin-Myers.)			
7	246	Miles Scott	S	Illinois	
7	256	Dallen Bentley	TE	Utah	Compensatory selection
7	257	Red Murdock	LB	Buffalo	Compensatory selection

2026 Denver Broncos undrafted free agents
Player	Position	College	Source(s)
Brent Austin	CB	California	
Luke Basso	LS	Oregon	
Blake Cotton	CB	Utah	
Ricardo Hallman	CB	Wisconsin	
Ahmari Harvey	CB	Georgia Tech	
Kolbe Katsis	WR	Northern Arizona	
Dane Key	WR	Nebraska	
Joseph Manjack	WR	TCU	
Paul Manning	CB	Henderson State	
Dasan McCullough	OLB	Nebraska	
Tyler Miller	OT	Iowa State	
Gavin Ortega	G	Weber State	
Parker Robertson	S	Oklahoma State	
Cam Ross	WR	Virginia	
Will Wright	CB	Tennessee	
Taurean York	ILB	Texas A&M	

Draft trades

=== Suspensions ===
==== Jonathon Cooper ====
On August 30, outside linebacker Jonathon Cooper was placed on the commissioner's exempt list after he received multiple charges stemming from a pair of domestic violence incidents during the offseason. On October 16, he was removed from the commissioner's exempt list and cleared to play.

=== Injuries ===
Position	Player	Time of injury	Type of injury	Reserve list	Games missed	Source(s)
G	Nick Gargiulo	Preseason week 2 (2025)	Torn ACL	Reserve/physically unable to perform	Weeks 1–11	
WR	Michael Woods II	OTAs	Leg	Waived/injured	None	
TE	Caleb Lohner	OTAs	Knee	Reserve/injured	Weeks 1–11	
ILB	Jordan Turner	Minicamp	Undisclosed	Active/non-football injury	None	
CB	Blake Cotton	Training camp	Hamstring	Waived/injured	None	
DE	Matt Henningsen	Training camp	Torn Achilles	Reserve/injured	Entire 2026 season	
C	Michael Deiter	Training camp	Hamstring	Reserve/injured	Entire 2026 season	
ILB	Levelle Bailey	Preseason week 1	Broken leg	Waived/injured	Entire 2026 season	
ILB	Drew Sanders	Preseason week 2	Undisclosed	Waived/injured	None	
T	Frank Crum	Preseason week 2	Leg	Reserve/injured	Weeks 1–11	
RB	RJ Harvey	Week 1	Hamstring	–	Week 2	
WR	Marvin Mims	Week 1	Foot	–	Weeks 2–3	
RB	Jonah Coleman	Week 2	Sprained ankle	Reserve/injured	Weeks 3–6	
OLB	Dondrea Tillman	Week 3	Hamstring	–	Week 4	
WR	Pat Bryant	Week 4	Ankle	Reserve/injured	Weeks 5–8	
CB	Riley Moss	Week 4	Ribs	–	Week 5	
CB	Patrick Surtain II	Week 4	Ankle	–	Weeks 5–7	
S	Talanoa Hufanga	Week 5	Ankle	–	Weeks 6–9	
RB	Tyler Badie	Week 6	Thumb	Reserve/injured	Weeks 7–11	
OLB	Jonah Elliss	Week 6	Ankle	Reserve/injured	Weeks 7–11	
RB	RJ Harvey	Week 8 practice	Knee	Reserve/injured	Weeks 8–12	
CB	Kris Abrams-Draine	Week 8	Ankle	–	Week 9	
S	Brandon Jones	Week 8	Hamstring	–	Week 9–11	
DE	Eyioma Uwazurike	Week 8	Shoulder	Reserve/injured	Weeks 9–13	

=== Practice squad elevations ===
Position	Name	Week(s)	Source(s)
CB	Brent Austin	5	
LS	Mitchell Fraboni	1, 2	
CB	Sean Fresch	5, 6, 7	
WR	Kolbe Katsis	3	
G	Gavin Ortega	8, 11	
FB	Adam Prentice	1, 2, 3	
S	Taylor Rapp	6, 7, 9	
RB	Cody Schrader	8, 9, 11	

== Staff ==
Denver Broncos staff
Front office: Owner – Rob Walton; Owner / CEO – Greg Penner; Owner – Carrie Walton Penner; Owner – Mellody Hobson; Owner – Condoleezza Rice; Owner – Lewis Hamilton; President – Damani Leech; General manager – George Paton; Assistant general manager – Reed Burckhardt; Vice president of player personnel – Cody Rager; Co-director of player personnel – Cam Williams; Co-director of player personnel – A. J. Durso; Director of pro personnel – Jordon Dizon; Assistant director of pro scouting – Ty Murphy; Vice president of football operations – Kelly Kleine Van Calligan; Vice president of football administration – Rich Hurtado; Vice president of player development – Ray Jackson; Vice president of football technology and research – Tony Lazzaro; Director of football analytics – Scott Flaska; Director of college scouting – Bryan Chesin; Assistant director of college scouting – Dave Bratten; Senior personnel executive – Roman Phifer; Senior personnel executive – Nick Schiralli; Head coach: Head coach – Sean Payton; Assistant head coach/offensive run game coordinator – Zach Strief; Assistant head coach/special teams coordinator - Darren Rizzi; Offensive coaches: Offensive coordinator – Davis Webb; Offensive pass game coordinator – John Morton; Quarterbacks – Logan Kilgore; Director of game management/assistant quarterbacks – Evan Rothstein; Running backs – Lou Ayeni; Wide receivers – Ronald Curry; Tight ends – Austin King; Offensive line – Chris Morgan; Offensive quality control – JD Johnson; Offensive quality control – Kyle Kempt; Offensive quality control – Willie Snead IV	Defensive coaches: Defensive coordinator – Vance Joseph; Defensive line – Jamar Cain; Inside linebackers – Jeff Schmedding; Outside linebackers – Isaac Shewmaker; Front seven - Michael Wilhoite; Defensive pass game coordinator – Robert Livingston; Defensive backs – Doug Belk; Senior defensive assistant – Joe Vitt; Defensive quality control – Todd Davis; Defensive quality control – Brian Niedermeyer; Special teams coaches: Assistant special teams – Marwan Maalouf; Special teams quality control – Zach Line; coaching operations/support: Assistant to the head coach – Paul Kelly; Strength and conditioning: Vice president of player health and performance – Beau Lowery; Director of strength and conditioning – Shaun Snee; Head strength and conditioning – Dan Dalrymple; Assistant strength and conditioning – Zaviar Gooden; Assistant strength and conditioning – Taylor Porter; → Coaching staff → Front office → More NFL staffs

== Current roster ==
Denver Broncos roster
Quarterbacks (QB): 4 Sam Ehlinger; 10 Bo Nix; 8 Jarrett Stidham; Running backs (RB): 20 Jonah Coleman; 27 J. K. Dobbins; 46 Adam Prentice FB; Wide receivers (WR): 13 Pat Bryant; 11 Troy Franklin; 5 Lil'Jordan Humphrey; 19 Marvin Mims RS; 14 Courtland Sutton; 17 Jaylen Waddle; Tight ends (TE): 45 Nate Adkins; 89 Dallen Bentley; 1 Evan Engram; 82 Adam Trautman	Offensive linemen (OL): 72 Garett Bolles T; 78 Kage Casey G; 54 Alex Forsyth C; 69 Mike McGlinchey T; 77 Quinn Meinerz G/C; 63 Alex Palczewski T; 79 Matt Peart T; 74 Ben Powers G; 60 Luke Wattenberg C; Defensive linemen (DL): 99 Zach Allen DE; 94 Jordan Jackson DE; 93 D. J. Jones DT; 95 Sai'vion Jones DE; 98 Tyler Onyedim DT; 97 Malcolm Roach DT	Linebackers (LB): 15 Nik Bonitto OLB; 0 Jonathon Cooper OLB; 47 Karene Reid ILB; 51 Que Robinson OLB; 49 Alex Singleton ILB; 40 Justin Strnad ILB; 92 Dondrea Tillman OLB; 55 Jordan Turner ILB; Defensive backs (DB): 31 Kris Abrams-Draine CB; 6 Tycen Anderson S; 23 Jahdae Barron CB; 9 Talanoa Hufanga S; 22 Brandon Jones S; 26 Devon Key S; 29 Ja'Quan McMillian CB; 21 Riley Moss CB; 30 Taylor Rapp S; 34 JL Skinner S; 2 Patrick Surtain II CB; Special teams (ST): 16 Jeremy Crawshaw P; 48 Mitchell Fraboni LS; 3 Wil Lutz K	Practice squad: 53 David Agoha OLB (IPP); 33 Brent Austin CB; 83 Michael Bandy WR; 37 Sean Fresch CB; 81 Kolbe Katsis WR; 87 Dane Key WR; 85 Lucas Krull TE; 90 Jordan Miller NT; 71 Tyler Miller T; 50 Red Murdock ILB; 68 Gavin Ortega G; 41 Jaret Patterson RB; 25 Cody Schrader RB; 39 Miles Scott S; 76 Calvin Throckmorton G; 59 Johnny Walker Jr. OLB; Reserve: 28 Tyler Badie RB (IR); 56 Levelle Bailey ILB (IR); 73 Frank Crum T (IR/DFR); 67 Michael Deiter C (IR); 52 Jonah Elliss OLB (IR); 66 Nick Gargiulo G (PUP); 12 RJ Harvey RB (IR); 91 Matt Henningsen DE (IR); 84 Caleb Lohner TE (IR/DFR); 96 Eyioma Uwazurike DE (IR) 53 active, 15 practice squad (1 IPP), 10 reserve As of November 21, 2026. Rookies in italics.; Roster; Depth chart; Transactions

== Preseason ==
Week	Date	Opponent	Result	Record	Venue	Recap
1	August 14	at Atlanta Falcons	W 27–7	1–0	Mercedes-Benz Stadium	Recap
2	August 21	Green Bay Packers	L 13–33	1–1	Empower Field at Mile High	Recap
3	August 28	Minnesota Vikings	W 34–6	2–1	Empower Field at Mile High	Recap

== Regular season ==
=== Schedule ===
Week	Date	Time (MT)	Opponent	Result	Record	Venue	Network	Recap
1	September 14	6:15 p.m.	at **Kansas City Chiefs**	**L** 10–31	0–1	Arrowhead Stadium	ESPN/ABC	Recap
2	September 20	2:05 p.m.	Jacksonville Jaguars	**W** 20–13	1–1	Empower Field at Mile High	CBS	Recap
3	September 27	6:20 p.m.	Los Angeles Rams	**W** 30–26	2–1	Empower Field at Mile High	NBC	Recap
4	October 4	2:25 p.m.	at San Francisco 49ers	**L** 14–24	2–2	Levi's Stadium	CBS	Recap
5	October 11	2:05 p.m.	at **Los Angeles Chargers**	**W** 23–17	3–2	SoFi Stadium	CBS	Recap
6	October 15	6:15 p.m.	Seattle Seahawks	**W** 17–14 (OT)	4–2	Empower Field at Mile High	Prime Video	Recap
7	October 25	2:05 p.m.	at Arizona Cardinals	**W** 30–16	5–2	State Farm Stadium	CBS	Recap
8	November 1	2:25 p.m.	**Kansas City Chiefs**	**W** 28–24	6–2	Empower Field at Mile High	CBS	Recap
9	November 8	11:00 a.m.	at Carolina Panthers	**W** 26–21	7–2	Bank of America Stadium	CBS	Recap
10	Bye							
11	November 22	2:25 p.m.	**Las Vegas Raiders**			Empower Field at Mile High	CBS	
12	November 27	1:00 p.m.	at Pittsburgh Steelers			Acrisure Stadium	Prime Video	
13	December 6	2:05 p.m.	Miami Dolphins			Empower Field at Mile High	Fox	
14	December 13	11:00 a.m.	at New York Jets			MetLife Stadium	CBS	
15	December 20	2:25 p.m.	at **Las Vegas Raiders**			Allegiant Stadium	CBS	
16	December 25	2:30 p.m.	Buffalo Bills			Empower Field at Mile High	Netflix	
17	January 2/3/4	TBD	at New England Patriots			Gillette Stadium	TBD	
18	January 9/10	TBD	**Los Angeles Chargers**			Empower Field at Mile High	TBD	

Notes

- Intra-division opponents are in **bold** text.
- Networks, dates and times from Weeks 13–15 are subject to change as a result of flexible scheduling; Week 16 is exempt.
- The date, time and network for Week 17 will be finalized by no later than the end of Week 15.
- The date, time and network for Week 18 will be finalized at the end of Week 17.

=== Game summaries ===
==== Week 1: at Kansas City Chiefs ====
Week 1: Denver Broncos at Kansas City Chiefs – Game summary

Quarter	1	2	3	4	Total
Broncos	7	0	3	0	**10**
**Chiefs**	7	7	10	7	**31**

at Arrowhead Stadium, Kansas City, Missouri

- Date: September 14
- Game time: 7:15 p.m. CDT/6:15 p.m. MDT
- Game weather: Fair, 91 °F (33 °C)
- Game attendance: 73,543
- Referee: Clay Martin
- TV announcers (ESPN/ABC): Joe Buck, Troy Aikman, Lisa Salters and Laura Rutledge
- Recap, Game Book

Game information

**First quarter**

- KC – Patrick Mahomes 15-yard run (Harrison Butker kick), 8:11. Chiefs 7–0. **Drive: 10 plays, 46 yards, 5:19.**
- DEN – Evan Engram 19-yard pass from Bo Nix (Wil Lutz kick), 3:48. Tied 7–7. **Drive: 7 plays, 68 yards, 4:23.**

**Second quarter**

- KC – Rashee Rice 13-yard pass from Patrick Mahomes (Harrison Butker kick), 1:39. Chiefs 14–7. **Drive: 10 plays, 80 yards, 3:02.**

**Third quarter**

- KC – Kenneth Walker III 60-yard run (Harrison Butker kick), 12:43. Chiefs 21–7. **Drive: 4 plays, 69 yards, 2:17.**
- DEN – Wil Lutz 31-yard field goal, 7:34. Chiefs 21–10. **Drive: 4 plays, -8 yards, 2:00.**
- KC – Harrison Butker 28-yard field goal, 3:17. Chiefs 24–10. **Drive: 7 plays, 58 yards, 4:17.**

**Fourth quarter**

- KC – Kenneth Walker III 1-yard pass from Patrick Mahomes (Harrison Butker kick), 14:39. Chiefs 31–10. **Drive: 4 plays, 34 yards, 0:48.**

**Top passers**

- DEN – Bo Nix – 17/28, 131 yards, TD, INT
- KC – Patrick Mahomes – 15/27, 184 yards, 2 TD, INT

**Top rushers**

- DEN – J. K. Dobbins – 8 rushes, 36 yards
- KC – Kenneth Walker III – 23 rushes, 173 yards, TD

**Top receivers**

- DEN – Evan Engram – 4 receptions, 43 yards, TD
- KC – Travis Kelce – 3 receptions, 71 yards

The Broncos kicked off their season on Monday Night Football against the Chiefs, and on the third play from scrimmage, quarterback Bo Nix was intercepted near midfield. The Chiefs capitalized, with quarterback Patrick Mahomes scrambling for a 15-yard touchdown. This marked Mahomes' return to game action, following a knee injury that he suffered late in the 2025 season. Denver responded when Nix connected with tight end Evan Engram on a 19-yard touchdown pass. The offense went three-and out on three of its next four possessions, and the Chiefs reclaimed a lead that they would not relinquish, with Mahomes throwing a 19-yard touchdown pass to wide receiver Rashee Rice just after the two-minute warning. Kansas City added to its lead on the opening possession of the second half, with running back Kenneth Walker III rushing for a 60-yard touchdown. On the Chiefs' next possession, Mahomes was intercepted by safety Brandon Jones and the Broncos had a first-and-goal at the opposing 3-yard line. However, after an offensive holding penalty, Denver failed to reach the end zone and was forced to settle for a 31-yard field goal by kicker Wil Lutz. Chiefs' kicker Harrison Butker responded, with a 28-yard field goal. After Nix was strip-sacked near the end of the third quarter, the Chiefs capitalized on another Broncos' turnover, and on the second play of the fourth quarter, Mahomes connected on a 2-yard touchdown pass to Walker to put the game out of reach. The Broncos' were plagued by a poor offensive performance under new offensive coordinator Davis Webb and numerous missed tackles on defense, surrendering 173 yards by Walker.

==== Week 2: vs. Jacksonville Jaguars ====
Week 2: Jacksonville Jaguars at Denver Broncos – Game summary

Quarter	1	2	3	4	Total
Jaguars	0	10	3	0	**13**
**Broncos**	0	3	3	14	**20**

at Empower Field at Mile High, Denver, Colorado

- Date: September 20
- Game time: 2:05 p.m. MDT
- Game weather: Partly cloudy, 73 °F (23 °C)
- Game attendance: 76,472
- Referee: John Hussey
- TV announcers (CBS): Ian Eagle, Ross Tucker and Evan Washburn
- Recap, Game Book

Game information

**First quarter**

- No scoring plays.

**Second quarter**

- JAX – Bhayshul Tuten 1-yard run (Cam Little kick), 12:13. Jaguars 7–0. **Drive: 8 plays, 72 yards, 4:52.**
- DEN – Wil Lutz 20-yard field goal, 7:01. Jaguars 7–3. **Drive: 8 plays, 58 yards, 5:12.**
- JAX – Cam Little 44-yard field goal, 0:00. Jaguars 10–3. **Drive: 7 plays, 54 yards, 2:08.**

**Third quarter**

- JAX – Cam Little 23-yard field goal, 9:02. Jaguars 13–3. **Drive: 11 plays, 64 yards, 5:58.**
- DEN – Wil Lutz 45-yard field goal, 4:58. Jaguars 13–6. **Drive: 8 plays, 45 yards, 4:04.**

**Fourth quarter**

- DEN – Nate Adkins 7-yard pass from Bo Nix (Wil Lutz kick), 11:47. Tied 13–13. **Drive: 10 plays, 64 yards, 4:46.**
- DEN – Jonah Coleman 3-yard run (Wil Lutz kick), 7:21. Broncos 20–13. **Drive: 5 plays, 56 yards, 2:21.**

**Top passers**

- JAX – Trevor Lawrence – 17/29, 189 yards, INT
- DEN – Bo Nix – 22/31, 288 yards, TD, INT

**Top rushers**

- JAX – Bhayshul Tuten – 13 rushes, 65 yards, TD
- DEN – Jonah Coleman – 10 rushes, 39 yards, TD

**Top receivers**

- JAX – Parker Washington – 7 receptions, 98 yards
- DEN – Jaylen Waddle – 8 receptions, 138 yards

After a scoreless first quarter, a 1-yard touchdown by running back Bhayshul Tuten gave the Jaguars the lead early in the second quarter. The Jaguars caught a break on their opening possession, after a strip-sack of quarterback Trevor Lawrence by Broncos' linebacker Nik Bonitto was nullified by an illegal contact penalty by cornerback Riley Moss. The Broncos' offense failed to score a touchdown on two consecutive first-and-goal opportunities—settling for a 20-yard field goal by placekicker Wil Lutz on the first possession, and quarterback Bo Nix throwing an interception in the end zone on the second possession. Jaguars' placekicker Cam Little added two field goals—a 44-yarder at the end of the first half, followed by a 23-yarder on the opening possession of the second half to give the Jaguars a 13–3 lead. The Broncos' defense held the Jaguars' offense scoreless for the remainder of the game, and the Broncos scored 17 unanswered points. First, Lutz kicked a 45-yard field goal. Then, following an interception of Lawrence by Moss, a 7-yard touchdown pass from Nix to tight end Nate Adkins tied the game at 13–13 early in the fourth quarter. Finally, after Little missed wide-left on a 54-yard field goal attempt, a 3-yard touchdown by running back Jonah Coleman gave the Broncos a 20–13 lead that would become the game's final score. After forcing a Jaguars' punt, the Broncos ran out the clock.

==== Week 3: vs. Los Angeles Rams ====
Week 3: Los Angeles Rams at Denver Broncos – Game summary

Quarter	1	2	3	4	Total
Rams	7	9	0	10	**26**
**Broncos**	0	0	16	14	**30**

at Empower Field at Mile High, Denver, Colorado

- Date: September 27
- Game time: 6:20 p.m. MDT
- Game weather: Mostly cloudy, 83 °F (28 °C)
- Game attendance: 76,333
- Referee: Bill Vinovich
- TV announcers (NBC): Mike Tirico, Cris Collinsworth and Melissa Stark
- Recap, Game Book

Game information

**First quarter**

- LAR – Tyler Higbee 5-yard pass from Matthew Stafford (Harrison Mevis kick), 4:55. Rams 7–0. **Drive: 11 plays, 63 yards, 4:32.**

**Second quarter**

- LAR – Harrison Mevis 36-yard field goal, 13:17. Rams 10–0. **Drive: 7 plays, 49 yards, 3:02.**
- LAR – Harrison Mevis 35-yard field goal, 4:43. Rams 13–0. **Drive: 14 plays, 63 yards, 7:02.**
- LAR – Harrison Mevis 40-yard field goal, 0:00. Rams 16–0. **Drive: 10 plays, 54 yards, 1:07.**

**Third quarter**

- DEN – Pat Bryant 5-yard pass from Bo Nix (Bo Nix–Jaylen Waddle pass), 7:44. Rams 16–8. **Drive: 12 plays, 42 yards, 5:08.**
- DEN – Nate Adkins 8-yard pass from Bo Nix (Bo Nix–Pat Bryant pass), 2:15. Tied 16–16. **Drive: 7 plays, 52 yards, 2:56.**

**Fourth quarter**

- LAR – Harrison Mevis 48-yard field goal, 8:40. Rams 19–16. **Drive: 7 plays, 7 yards, 4:18.**
- DEN – Talanoa Hufanga 66-yard interception return (Wil Lutz kick), 4:49. Broncos 23–19.
- LAR – Konata Mumpfield 48-yard pass from Matthew Stafford (Harrison Mevis kick), 3:38. Rams 26–23. **Drive: 4 plays, 77 yards, 1:11.**
- DEN – Bo Nix 1-yard run (Wil Lutz kick), 0:47. Broncos 30–26. **Drive: 10 plays, 65 yards, 2:51.**

**Top passers**

- LAR – Matthew Stafford – 30/55, 390 yards, 2 TD, 2 INT
- DEN – Bo Nix – 17/34, 186 yards, 2 TD, INT

**Top rushers**

- LAR – Kyren Williams – 15 rushes, 88 yards
- DEN – J. K. Dobbins – 17 rushes, 49 yards

**Top receivers**

- LAR – Davante Adams – 7 receptions, 137 yards
- DEN – Courtland Sutton – 3 receptions, 46 yards

The Broncos trailed 16–0 at halftime, after the defense allowed a 5-yard touchdown pass from Rams' quarterback Matthew Stafford to tight end Tyler Higbee and three field goals by placekicker Harrison Mevis. The Broncos' only scoring opportunity occurred late in the first quarter, when placekicker Wil Lutz hit the left upright on a 43-yard field goal attempt. After both teams went three-and-out to start the second half, the Broncos got on the scoreboard midway through the third quarter, with quarterback Bo Nix throwing two touchdown passes—a 5-yarder to wide receiver Pat Bryant, followed by a 4-yarder to tight end Nate Adkins—both with successful two-point conversions, to tie the game at 16–16. On the Broncos' next possession, Nix was intercepted by cornerback Josh Wallace; however, the Rams were forced to settle for a 48-yard field goal by Mevis. After the Broncos went three-and-out, Stafford was intercepted by safety Talanoa Hufanga, who returned the football 66 yards for a touchdown to give the Broncos their first lead with five minutes remaining. Stafford, however, redeemed himself on the Rams' next possession, launching a 48-yard touchdown pass to wide receiver Konata Mumpfield to give the Rams a 26–23 lead with 3:38 remaining.

The Broncos began their final drive of the game at their own 35-yard line, and reached the Rams' 21-yard line at the two-minute warning following 36- and 21-yard completions to wide receivers Bryant and Troy Franklin. At 1:15, Nix was intercepted by Wallace near the sideline that would have sealed the game for Rams; however, Wallace was flagged for defensive pass interference for pushing off Bryant. The Broncos benefited from two more Rams' defensive penalties, and after a rushing touchdown by Nix was overturned by a booth review, the Broncos faced a 3rd-and-goal at the 1-yard line. Nix extended the football over the plane of the goal line for a touchdown that gave the Broncos a 30–26 lead with 48 seconds remaining. The Rams, however, were not done yet. Starting from their own 33-yard line, Stafford led the Rams to the Broncos' 14-yard line with only two seconds remaining and no timeouts. Following a false start penalty that moved the football back to the 19-yard line, Stafford's pass intended for wide receiver Davante Adams on the final play of the game was intercepted by Hufanga at the goal line. With the comeback victory, the Broncos snapped a five-game losing streak to the Rams, dating back to 2006, when the Rams were based in St. Louis. The Broncos' last victory over the Rams occurred during Week 1 of the 2002 season.

==== Week 4: at San Francisco 49ers ====
Week 4: Denver Broncos at San Francisco 49ers – Game summary

Quarter	1	2	3	4	Total
Broncos	3	0	0	11	**14**
**49ers**	0	3	7	14	**24**

at Levi's Stadium, Santa Clara, California

- Date: October 4
- Game time: 2:25 p.m. MDT/1:25 p.m. PDT
- Game weather: Sunny, 87 °F (31 °C)
- Game attendance: 70,776
- Referee: Ronald Torbert
- TV announcers (CBS): Kevin Harlan, Trent Green and Melanie Collins
- Recap, Game Book

Game information

**First quarter**

- DEN – Will Lutz 52-yard field goal, 1:43. Broncos 3–0. **Drive: 13 plays, 55 yards, 7:48.**

**Second quarter**

- SF – Eddy Piñeiro 24-yard field goal, 1:36. Tied 3–3. **Drive: 12 plays, 74 yards, 3:25.**

**Third quarter**

- SF – Deebo Samuel 1-yard pass from Brock Purdy (Eddy Piñeiro kick), 4:15. 49ers 10–3. **Drive: 9 plays, 28 yards, 5:25.**

**Fourth quarter**

- DEN – Will Lutz 40-yard field goal, 14:08. 49ers 10–6. **Drive: 11 plays, 63 yards, 5:07.**
- SF – Christian McCaffrey 1-yard run (Eddy Piñeiro kick), 8:52. 49ers 17–6. **Drive: 9 plays, 74 yards, 5:16.**
- DEN – Jaylen Waddle 13-yard pass from Bo Nix (Tyler Badie run), 4:05. 49ers 17–14. **Drive: 8 plays, 70 yards, 4:47.**
- SF – George Kittle 56-yard pass from Brock Purdy (Eddy Piñeiro kick), 2:15. 49ers 24–14. **Drive: 5 plays, 69 yards, 1:50.**

**Top passers**

- DEN – Bo Nix – 25/42, 214 yards, TD
- SF – Brock Purdy – 19/30, 218 yards, 2 TD

**Top rushers**

- DEN – J.K. Dobbins – 11 rushes, 40 yards
- SF – Christian McCaffrey – 15 rushes, 52 yards, TD

**Top receivers**

- DEN – RJ Harvey – 10 receptions, 68 yards
- SF – Mike Evans – 5 receptions, 74 yards

The first half featured a defensive struggle, with the only scoring coming by way of the placekickers—a 52-yard field goal by the Broncos' Wil Lutz in the first quarter and a 24-yarder by the 49ers' Eddy Piñeiro just after the two-minute warning. After the Broncos' were forced to punt, Piñeiro's 54-yard attempt at the end of the first half was blocked by Broncos' defensive end Zach Allen. After Broncos' return specialist Marvin Mims muffed a punt, the 49ers capitalized, with a 1-yard touchdown pass from quarterback Brock Purdy to wide receiver Deebo Samuel at the 4:22 mark of the third quarter. A 40-yard field goal by Lutz pulled the Broncos to within a 10–6 deficit early in the fourth quarter; however, a 2-yard touchdown run by running back Christian McCaffrey increased the 49ers' lead. After struggling throughout the entire game, the Broncos' offense did not reach the end zone until the 4:10 mark of the fourth quarter, when quarterback Bo Nix connected with wide receiver Jaylen Waddle on a 13-yard touchdown pass; a successful two-point conversion by running back Tyler Badie narrowed the 49ers' lead to 17–14. However, the Broncos' defense, which failed to record a single sack of Purdy, was unable to stop the 49ers on the ensuing drive. Purdy converted a key first down on a 3rd-and-1, and two plays later, Purdy hooked up with tight end George Kittle on a 56-yard touchdown pass on a screen play just before the two-minute warning.

==== Week 5: at Los Angeles Chargers ====
Week 5: Denver Broncos at Los Angeles Chargers – Game summary

Quarter	1	2	3	4	Total
**Broncos**	7	3	0	13	**23**
Chargers	0	3	14	0	**17**

at SoFi Stadium, Inglewood, California

- Date: October 11
- Game time: 2:05 p.m. MDT/1:05 p.m. PDT
- Game weather: Cloudy, 70 °F (21 °C) (fixed roof)
- Game attendance: 69,293
- Referee: Shawn Hochuli
- TV announcers (CBS): Ian Eagle, Ross Tucker and Evan Washburn
- Recap, Game Book

Game information

**First quarter**

- DEN – J. K. Dobbins 2-yard run (Wil Lutz kick), 6:53. Broncos 7–0. **Drive: 4 plays, 40 yards, 1:43.**

**Second quarter**

- LAC – Cameron Dicker 42-yard field goal, 8:18. Broncos 7–3. **Drive: 10 plays, 33 yards, 4:55.**
- DEN – Wil Lutz 34-yard field goal, 1:48. Broncos 10–3. **Drive: 14 plays, 60 yards, 6:30.**

**Third quarter**

- LAC – Hayden Rucci 7-yard pass from Justin Herbert (Cameron Dicker kick), 5:32. Tied 10–10. **Drive: 14 plays, 73 yards, 9:28.**
- LAC – Kimani Vidal 42-yard run (Cameron Dicker kick), 0:57. Chargers 17–10. **Drive: 1 play, 42 yards, 0:10.**

**Fourth quarter**

- DEN – Courtland Sutton 5-yard pass from Bo Nix (Wil Lutz kick), 8:53. Tied 17–17. **Drive: 5 plays, 41 yards, 1:34.**
- DEN – Wil Lutz 19-yard field goal, 5:07. Broncos 20–17. **Drive: 5 plays, 22 yards, 2:48.**
- DEN – Wil Lutz 36-yard field goal, 1:08. Broncos 23–17. **Drive: 5 plays, 16 yards, 2:11.**

**Top passers**

- DEN – Bo Nix – 16/27, 123 yards, TD
- LAC – Justin Herbert – 14/24, 121 yards, TD, INT

**Top rushers**

- DEN – J. K. Dobbins – 18 rushes, 68 yards, TD
- LAC – Kimani Vidal – 8 rushes, 57 yards, TD

**Top receivers**

- DEN – Evan Engram – 4 receptions, 55 yards
- LAC – Charlie Kolar – 3 receptions, 37 yards

After Broncos' safety Talanoa Hufanga forced a fumble on the Chargers' first possession, the Broncos capitalized, with a 2-yard touchdown by running back J. K. Dobbins. The only scoring in the second quarter came by way of the placekickers—a 42-yard field goal by the Chargers' Cameron Dicker, followed by a 34-yarder by the Broncos' Wil Lutz just after the two-minute warning. The Chargers took the opening possession of the second half, and quarterback Justin Herbert connected with tight end Hayden Rucci on a 7-yard touchdown pass. After Broncos' quarterback Bo Nix was strip-sacked, the Chargers immediately capitalized, and took a 17–10 lead, with running back Kimani Vidal rushing for a 42-yard touchdown late in the third quarter. The Broncos' defense held the Chargers scoreless in the fourth quarter, and after an exchange of punts and a missed 42-yard field goal attempt by Lutz, a 5-yard touchdown from Nix to wide receiver Courtland Sutton tied the game at 17–17 at the 8:56 mark of the fourth quarter. After Broncos' defensive end Zach Allen forced a fumble off Herbert, which gave the Broncos excellent field position, the Broncos were forced to settle for a short 19-yard field goal by Lutz, after failing to reach the end zone on a 3rd-and-goal from the 7-yard line. Four plays later, Herbert was intercepted by safety Brandon Jones; however, the Broncos were unable to run out the clock and were forced to settle for another field goal by Lutz—a 36-yarder—to give the Broncos a 23–17 lead with 1:12 remaining, giving the Chargers one last possession. With no timeouts remaining, Herbert drove the Chargers to the Broncos' 39-yard line, after a defensive holding penalty on linebacker Justin Strnad and an incomplete spike to stop the clock with three seconds remaining. Herbert was sacked by cornerback Ja'Quan McMillian to seal the win for the Broncos.

==== Week 6: vs. Seattle Seahawks ====
Week 6: Seattle Seahawks at Denver Broncos – Game summary

Quarter	1	2	3	4	OT	Total
Seahawks	3	0	0	11	0	**14**
**Broncos**	0	14	0	0	3	**17**

at Empower Field at Mile High, Denver, Colorado

- Date: October 15
- Game time: 6:15 p.m. MDT
- Game weather: Clear, 53 °F (12 °C)
- Game attendance: 76,973
- Referee: Brad Rogers
- TV announcers (Prime Video): Al Michaels, Kirk Herbstreit and Kaylee Hartung
- Recap, Game Book

Game information

**First quarter**

- SEA – Jason Myers 55-yard field goal, 6:31. Seahawks 3–0. **Drive: 6 plays, 18 yards, 1:58.**

**Second quarter**

- DEN – J. K. Dobbins 4-yard run (Wil Lutz kick), 12:52. Broncos 7–3. **Drive: 16 plays, 74 yards, 8:39.**
- DEN – RJ Harvey 1-yard run (Wil Lutz kick), 5:15. Broncos 14–3. **Drive: 9 plays, 79 yards, 4:32.**

**Third quarter**

- No scoring plays

**Fourth quarter**

- SEA – George Holani 1-yard run (Sam Darnold–Rashid Shaheed pass), 5:41. Broncos 14–11. **Drive: 11 plays, 67 yards, 3:37.**
- SEA – Jason Myers 34-yard field goal, 0:03. Tied 14–14. **Drive: 8 plays, 38 yards, 0:54.**

**Overtime**

- DEN – Wil Lutz 53-yard field goal, 4:53. Broncos 17–14. **Drive: 4 plays, 8 yards, 2:18.**

**Top passers**

- SEA – Sam Darnold – 27/51, 278 yards, 2 INT
- DEN – Bo Nix – 17/27, 107 yards

**Top rushers**

- SEA – Emanuel Wilson – 14 rushes, 52 yards
- DEN – J. K. Dobbins – 17 rushes, 41 yards, TD

**Top receivers**

- SEA – Jaxon Smith-Njigba – 12 receptions, 134 yards
- DEN – RJ Harvey – 3 receptions, 31 yards

The interior of Empower Field during Week 6 against the Seattle Seahawks, just after the two-minute warning of the fourth quarter with Denver leading 14–11

After a 55-yard field goal by Seahawks' placekicker Jason Myers in the first quarter, the Broncos took a 14–3 lead, with a pair of short rushing touchdowns in the second quarter by running backs J. K. Dobbins and RJ Harvey. The Broncos' offense struggled in the second half against the Seahawks' No. 1-ranked defense, only earning two first downs and failing to advance past their own 44-yard line. Myers hit the left upright on an unsuccessful 47-yard field goal attempt midway through the third quarter, and the Broncos' defense held the Seahawks scoreless until the 5:47 mark of the fourth quarter, when running back George Holani rushed for a 1-yard touchdown. This was followed by a successful two-point conversion pass from quarterback Sam Darnold to wide receiver Rashid Shaheed to narrow the Broncos' lead to 14–11. After the Broncos went three-and-out, Darnold was intercepted by cornerback Kris Abrams-Draine at the Broncos' 31-yard line with 1:31 remaining in the game. However, the Broncos' offense once again went three-and-out, and eight plays later, a 34-yard field goal by Myers sent the game to overtime. The Broncos won the overtime coin toss and deferred the opening possession to the Seahawks, who started at their own 13-yard line following a holding penalty on the kickoff return. Six plays later, the Broncos' defense once again came up big, with another interception of Darnold—this time by cornerback Ja'Quan McMillian. The Broncos started their first possession of overtime at the Seahawks' 43-yard line, and despite gaining only eight yards, placekicker Wil Lutz kicked the game-winning 53-yard field goal.

==== Week 7: at Arizona Cardinals ====
Week 7: Denver Broncos at Arizona Cardinals – Game summary

Quarter	1	2	3	4	Total
**Broncos**	6	7	14	3	**30**
Cardinals	0	6	7	3	**16**

at State Farm Stadium, Glendale, Arizona

- Date: October 25
- Game time: 2:05 p.m. MDT/1:05 p.m. MST
- Game weather: None (retractable roof closed)
- Game attendance: 64,871
- Referee: Craig Wrolstad
- TV announcers (CBS): Kevin Harlan, Trent Green and Melanie Collins
- Recap, Game Book

Game information

**First quarter**

- DEN – Wil Lutz 48-yard field goal, 11:00. Broncos 3–0. **Drive: 8 plays, 29 yards, 4:00.**
- DEN – Wil Lutz 43-yard field goal, 1:08. Broncos 6–0. **Drive: 8 plays, 22 yards, 4:17.**

**Second quarter**

- ARI – Chad Ryland 30-yard field goal, 14:16. Broncos 6–3. **Drive: 5 plays, 60 yards, 1:52.**
- ARI – Chad Ryland 26-yard field goal, 4:30. Tied 6–6. **Drive: 14 plays, 65 yards, 7:55.**
- DEN – Bo Nix 62-yard run (Wil Lutz kick), 3:43. Broncos 13–6. **Drive: 2 plays, 65 yards, 0:47.**

**Third quarter**

- DEN – RJ Harvey 52-yard pass from Bo Nix (Wil Lutz kick), 10:26. Broncos 20–6. **Drive: 3 plays, 62 yards, 1:31.**
- ARI – Trey McBride 7-yard pass from Jacoby Brissett (Chad Ryland kick), 3:50. Broncos 20–13. **Drive: 10 plays, 68 yards, 6:36.**
- DEN – J. K. Dobbins 1-yard run (Wil Lutz kick), 0:00. Broncos 27–13. **Drive: 6 plays, 76 yards, 3:50.**

**Fourth quarter**

- DEN – Wil Lutz 31-yard field goal, 8:39. Broncos 30–13. **Drive: 10 plays, 53 yards, 4:11.**
- ARI – Chad Ryland 41-yard field goal, 6:21. Broncos 30–16. **Drive: 10 plays, 42 yards, 2:18.**

**Top passers**

- DEN – Bo Nix – 15/29, 222 yards, TD
- ARI – Jacoby Brissett – 27/48, 272 yards, TD

**Top rushers**

- DEN – Bo Nix – 7 rushes, 73 yards, TD
- ARI – Bam Knight – 7 rushes, 48 yards

**Top receivers**

- DEN – RJ Harvey – 2 receptions, 54 yards, TD
- ARI – Trey McBride – 10 receptions, 111 yards, TD

All of the scoring started by way of the placekickers—48- and 43-yard field goals by the Broncos' Wil Lutz in the first quarter, followed by 30- and 26-yarders by the Cardinals' Chad Ryland in the second quarter. After the latter field goal, quarterback Bo Nix ran for a 62-yard touchdown that gave the Broncos a lead they would never relinquish. It was the longest touchdown run by a Broncos' quarterback in franchise history. Nix later connected with running back RJ Harvey on a screen play that resulted in a 52-yard touchdown, which was countered by a 7-yard touchdown from Cardinals' quarterback Jacoby Brissett to tight end Trey McBride. A 1-yard touchdown by running back J. K. Dobbins on the final play of the third quarter increased the Broncos' lead, and Lutz' third field goal of the game—a 31-yarder at the 8:43 mark of the fourth quarter—put the game out of reach. Ryland added a 41-yard field goal, and the Cardinals later failed to reach the end zone following a 1st-and-goal at the Broncos' 1-yard line at the two-minute warning. With the win, the Broncos improved their all-time series record against the Cardinals to 11–1–1.

==== Week 8: vs. Kansas City Chiefs ====
Week 8: Kansas City Chiefs at Denver Broncos – Game summary

Quarter	1	2	3	4	Total
Chiefs	7	10	7	0	**24**
**Broncos**	3	10	0	15	**28**

at Empower Field at Mile High, Denver, Colorado

- Date: November 1
- Game time: 2:25 p.m. MST
- Game weather: Cloudy, 63 °F (17 °C)
- Game attendance: 76,831
- Referee: Clete Blakeman
- TV announcers (CBS): Jim Nantz, J.J. Watt and Tracy Wolfson
- Recap, Game Book

Game information

**First quarter**

- DEN – Wil Lutz 39-yard field goal, 9:43. Broncos 3–0. **Drive: 8 plays, 62 yards, 3:58.**
- KC – Rashee Rice 11-yard pass from Patrick Mahomes (Harrison Butker kick), 6:04. Chiefs 7–3. **Drive: 7 plays, 69 yards, 3:39.**

**Second quarter**

- DEN – Wil Lutz 45-yard field goal, 14:08. Chiefs 7–6. **Drive: 9 plays, 44 yards, 2:59.**
- KC – Emmett Johnson 73-yard pass from Patrick Mahomes (Harrison Butker kick), 7:40. Chiefs 14–6. **Drive: 9 plays, 65 yards, 3:18.**
- DEN – Jaylen Waddle 1-yard pass from Bo Nix (Wil Lutz kick), 1:15. Chiefs 14–13. **Drive: 12 plays, 69 yards, 6:25.**
- KC – Harrison Butker 45-yard field goal, 0:19. Chiefs 17–13. **Drive: 6 plays, 47 yards, 0:56.**

**Third quarter**

- KC – Noah Gray 4-yard pass from Patrick Mahomes (Harrison Butker kick), 1:38. Chiefs 24–13. **Drive: 11 plays, 63 yards, 5:24.**

**Fourth quarter**

- DEN – Nate Adkins 2-yard pass from Bo Nix (Bo Nix–Jaylen Waddle pass), 8:55. Chiefs 24–21. **Drive: 9 plays, 80 yards, 4:18.**
- DEN – Jonah Coleman 5-yard run (Wil Lutz kick), 1:56. Broncos 28–24. **Drive: 2 plays, 56 yards, 0:35.**

**Top passers**

- KC – Patrick Mahomes – 30/41, 321 yards, 3 TD
- DEN – Bo Nix – 20/32, 222 yards, 2 TD

**Top rushers**

- KC – Kenneth Walker III – 21 rushes, 69 yards
- DEN – Jonah Coleman – 11 rushes, 41 yards, TD

**Top receivers**

- KC – Emmett Johnson – 5 receptions, 128 yards, TD
- DEN – Jonah Coleman – 4 receptions, 63 yards

The Chiefs' led 17–13 at halftime, with each team alternating scoring plays. The Chiefs' scoring output consisted of two touchdown passes from quarterback Patrick Mahomes—one apiece to wide receiver Rashee Rice and running back Emmett Johnson—and one field goal by placekicker Harrison Butker. The Broncos' scoring output consisted of two field goals by placekicker Wil Lutz and a 1-yard touchdown pass from quarterback Bo Nix to wide receiver Jaylen Waddle. The Broncos went three-and-out on all three of their offensive possessions in the third quarter, and Mahomes' third touchdown of the game—a 4-yard pass to tight end Noah Gray—increased the Chiefs' lead to 24–13 late in the third quarter. However, the Broncos' mounted yet another fourth quarter comeback, and Nix connected with tight end Nate Adkins on a 2-yard touchdown pass on a 4th-and-goal at the 2-yard line, coupled with a successful two-point conversion. On the Chiefs' ensuing possession, Butker missed wide-right on a 54-yard field goal attempt, and following a 51-yard pass completion from Nix to running back Jonah Coleman, the Broncos took a 28–24 lead at the two-minute warning, with Coleman rushing for a 5-yard touchdown.

The Chiefs, however, were not done yet. After Johnson returned the ensuing kickoff to the 44-yard line, Mahomes led the Chiefs to a 1st-and-goal at the Broncos' 4-yard line in only three plays with 35 seconds remaining. After running back Kenneth Walker III was stopped at the 1-yard line, Mahomes threw an incomplete pass. On 3rd-and-goal, the Broncos' defense stopped Walker for no gain, forcing the Chiefs to call their final timeout with only four seconds remaining. After Chiefs' tackle Jaylon Moore was flagged for a false start penalty, which moved the football back to the 6-yard line, Mahomes was sacked by Broncos' defensive tackle Malcolm Roach to end the game.

==== Week 9: at Carolina Panthers ====
Week 9: Denver Broncos at Carolina Panthers – Game summary

Quarter	1	2	3	4	Total
**Broncos**	10	3	0	13	**26**
Panthers	0	7	7	7	**21**

at Bank of America Stadium, Charlotte, North Carolina

- Date: November 8
- Game time: 1:00 p.m. EST/11:00 a.m. MST
- Game weather: Sunny, 63 °F (17 °C)
- Game attendance: 73,075
- Referee: Alan Eck
- TV announcers (CBS): Ian Eagle, Ross Tucker and Evan Washburn
- Recap, Game Book

Game information

**First quarter**

- DEN – Wil Lutz 26-yard field goal, 11:09. Broncos 3–0. **Drive: 9 plays, 47 yards, 3:51.**
- DEN – Courtland Sutton 3-yard pass from Bo Nix (Wil Lutz kick), 1:23. Broncos 10–0. **Drive: 10 plays, 81 yards, 6:42.**

**Second quarter**

- CAR – Tommy Tremble 10-yard pass from Bryce Young (Ryan Fitzgerald kick), 1:27. Broncos 10–7. **Drive: 14 plays, 86 yards, 6:02.**
- DEN – Wil Lutz 48-yard field goal, 0:04. Broncos 13–7. **Drive: 7 plays, 30 yards, 1:23.**

**Third quarter**

- CAR – Darren Waller 15-yard pass from Bryce Young (Ryan Fitzgerald kick), 11:30. Panthers 14–13. **Drive: 6 plays, 65 yards, 3:30.**

**Fourth quarter**

- DEN – Jonah Coleman 9-yard run (pass failed), 10:17. Broncos 19–14. **Drive: 14 plays, 80 yards, 6:13.**
- DEN – Pat Bryant 26-yard pass from Bo Nix (Wil Lutz kick), 5:41. Broncos 26–14. **Drive: 6 plays, 61 yards, 3:30.**
- CAR – Tetairoa McMillan 4-yard pass from Bryce Young (Ryan Fitzgerald kick), 3:05. Broncos 26–21. **Drive: 12 plays, 64 yards, 2:36.**

**Top passers**

- DEN – Bo Nix – 25/37, 237 yards, 2 TD, INT
- CAR – Bryce Young – 28/39, 276 yards, 3 TD, INT

**Top rushers**

- DEN – Jonah Coleman – 15 rushes, 57 yards, TD
- CAR – Chuba Hubbard – 16 rushes, 79 yards

**Top receivers**

- DEN – Pat Bryant – 4 receptions, 56 yards, TD
- CAR – Darren Waller – 8 receptions, 90 yards, TD

The Broncos took a 10–0 lead in the first quarter, with a 26-yard field goal by placekicker Wil Lutz, followed by a 3-yard touchdown pass from quarterback Bo Nix to wide receiver Courtland Sutton. After Panthers' placekicker Ryan Fitzgerald missed wide-right on a 43-yard field goal attempt, the Broncos were attempting to add to their lead; however, Nix was intercepted by Panthers' cornerback Corey Thornton at the Panthers' 19-yard line. The Panthers marched down the field, and got on the scoreboard, with a 10-yard touchdown pass from quarterback Bryce Young to tight end Tommy Tremble. A 48-yard field goal by Lutz increased the Broncos' lead to 13–7 just before halftime. On the opening possession of the second half, the Panthers took a 14–13 lead, with Young connecting with tight end Darren Waller on a 15-yard touchdown pass. After a Broncos' punt, the Panthers marched down the field, with a 1st-and-goal at the Broncos' 1-yard line. On the first play from scrimmage, Young threw a pass in the corner of the end zone that was intended for Tremble that was initially ruled incomplete. However, just before the Panthers were able to run a second-down play, Broncos' head coach Sean Payton threw a red challenge flag, and an instant replay review revealed that Broncos' safety Devon Key pulled off an improbable interception that was batted in the air by Tremble, resulting in a touchback. The Broncos then re-claimed the lead early in the fourth quarter on a 14-play, 80-yard drive, culminating in a 9-yard touchdown pass from Nix to running back Jonah Coleman; the two-point conversion pass from Nix intended for Sutton was unsuccessful, leaving the score at 19–14. After forcing a three-and-out from the Panthers, a 26-yard touchdown pass from Nix to wide receiver Pat Bryant increased the Broncos' lead to 26–14 with 5:46 remaining in the game. The Panthers responded, with Young's third touchdown pass of the game—a 4-yarder to wide receiver Tetairoa McMillan—at the 3:08 mark of the fourth quarter. The Broncos averted disaster after Coleman recovered a fumbled snap by Nix, but went three-and-out and were forced to punt at the two-minute warning. The Panthers started their final offensive possession at their own 44-yard line. Following a 20-yard pass completion from Young to McMillan, Young was strip-sacked by Broncos' linebacker Nik Bonitto, and Bonitto recovered the game-clinching fumble. With the win, the Broncos entered their bye week with a 7–2 record, set a new NFL record for consecutive wins in one-score games, with 16, and the Broncos improved their all-time record against the Panthers to 8–2, including Super Bowl 50.

==== Week 11: vs. Las Vegas Raiders ====
Week 11: Las Vegas Raiders at Denver Broncos – Game summary

Quarter	1	2	3	4	Total
Raiders	0	0	0	0	**0**
Broncos	0	0	0	0	**0**

at Empower Field at Mile High, Denver, Colorado

- Date: November 22
- Game time: 2:25 p.m. MST
- Game weather: Mostly sunny, 44 °F (7 °C)
- Game attendance: 76,703
- Referee: Carl Cheffers
- TV announcers (CBS): Andrew Catalon, Logan Ryan and AJ Ross
- Preview

=== Standings ===
==== Division ====
AFC West
	W	L	T	PCT	DIV	CONF	PF	PA	STK
Kansas City Chiefs	8	2	0	.800	3–1	6–1	271	163	W3
Denver Broncos	7	2	0	.778	2–1	3–1	198	186	W5
Las Vegas Raiders	4	6	0	.400	1–1	3–3	251	289	L2
Los Angeles Chargers	1	8	0	.111	0–3	1–5	144	239	W1

==== Conference ====
AFC
Seed	Team	Division	W	L	T	PCT	DIV	CONF	SOS	SOV	STK
**Division leaders**
1	Buffalo Bills	East	9	1	0	.900	2–1	6–1	.424	.416	W6
2	Kansas City Chiefs	West	8	2	0	.800	3–1	6–1	.374	.300	W3
3 (Note: Jacksonville wins tie break over Cincinnati based on head-to-head victory.)	Jacksonville Jaguars	South	7	2	0	.778	2–1	6–2	.444	.408	W3
4	Cincinnati Bengals	North	7	2	0	.778	2–1	5–2	.389	.310	W5
**Wild cards**
5	Denver Broncos	West	7	2	0	.778	2–1	3–1	.591	.522	W5
6 (Note: Cleveland wins tie break over Pittsburgh based on division record.)	Cleveland Browns	North	6	4	0	.600	2–1	4–3	.410	.377	W1
7	Pittsburgh Steelers	North	6	4	0	.600	2–2	3–3	.465	.417	L2
**In the hunt**
8	New England Patriots	East	5	5	0	.500	3–0	5–1	.576	.440	L2
9 (Note: Houston wins tie break over Las Vegas based on strength of victory.)	Houston Texans	South	4	6	0	.400	3–1	4–4	.480	.308	W1
10	Las Vegas Raiders	West	4	6	0	.400	1–1	3–3	.500	.179	L2
11	Baltimore Ravens	North	4	7	0	.364	0–2	2–5	.459	.286	L6
12	Indianapolis Colts	South	3	8	0	.273	1–3	2–6	.463	.293	L1
13	New York Jets	East	2	8	0	.200	0–3	2–5	.560	.350	L5
14	Los Angeles Chargers	West	1	8	0	.111	0–3	1–5	.560	.364	W1
15 (Note: Tennessee wins tie break over Miami based on strength of victory.)	Tennessee Titans	South	1	9	0	.100	1–2	1–6	.465	.273	L4
16	Miami Dolphins	East	1	9	0	.100	1–2	1–6	.622	.200	L4

=== Statistics ===
==== Team leaders ====
Category	Player(s)	Value
Passing yards	Bo Nix	1,730
Passing touchdowns	Bo Nix	11
Rushing yards	J. K. Dobbins	324
Rushing touchdowns	Jonah Coleman; J. K. Dobbins	3
Receptions	Jaylen Waddle	30
Receiving yards	Jaylen Waddle	337
Receiving touchdowns	Nate Adkins	3
Points	Wil Lutz	64
Kickoff return yards	Marvin Mims	206
Punt return yards	Marvin Mims	128
Tackles	Alex Singleton	107
Sacks	Zach Allen; Nik Bonitto	4.5
Forced fumbles	three tied	2
Interceptions	Talanoa Hufanga; Brandon Jones	2

Team statistics updated through Week 9.
Source for this section: Denver Broncos' official website.

==== League rankings ====
Offense
Category	Value	NFL rank (out of 32)
Total yards	277.3 YPG	30th
Yards per play	4.8	T–26th
Rushing yards	91.4 YPG	26th
Yards per rush	3.7	T–27th
Passing yards	185.9 YPG	25th
Yards per pass	6.0	T–27th
Pass completions	174/287 (.606)	25th
Total touchdowns	21	T–20th
Rushing touchdowns	9	T–12th
Receiving touchdowns	11	T–21st
Scoring	22.0 PPG	T–19th
Red Zone Touchdowns	17/27 (.630)	13th
Third down efficiency	36/111 (.324)	31st
Fourth down efficiency	5/6 (.833)	2nd
First downs per game	18.2	T–20th
Fewest sacks allowed	11	1st
Fewest giveaways	7	T–2nd
Fewest penalties	69	T–18th
Least penalty yardage	478	10th

Defense
Category	Value	NFL rank (out of 32)
Total yards	355.0 YPG	27th
Yards per play	5.2	T–10th
Rushing yards	124.3 YPG	24th
Yards per rush	4.5	T–26th
Passing yards	230.7 YPG	20th
Yards per pass	6.5	T–8th
Pass completions	207/344 (.602)	4th
Total touchdowns	20	T–8th
Rushing touchdowns	6	T–7th
Receiving touchdowns	14	T–16th
Scoring	20.7 PPG	9th
Red Zone Touchdowns	15/29 (.517)	9th
Third down efficiency	54/131 (.412)	21st
Fourth down efficiency	10/17 (.588)	20th
First downs per game	22.0	29th
Sacks	26	T–9th
Takeaways	12	T–16th
Fewest penalties	74	T–25th
Least penalty yardage	647	30th

Special teams
Category	Value	NFL rank (out of 32)
Gross punting	48.4 YPP	T–9th
Net punting	44.2 YPP	3rd
Kickoffs	60.1 YPK	16th
Punt returns	9.9 YPR	16th
Kick returns	26.3 YPR	11th
Punt coverage	8.4 YPR	11th
Kick coverage	25.6 YPR	T–11th

League statistics updated through Week 10.
Source for this section: Pro-Football Reference.

=== Starters ===
Position	Player	Age	Years pro	Starts
Offense
QB	Bo Nix	26	2	7
RB	J. K. Dobbins	28	6	6
WR	Jaylen Waddle	28	5	7
WR	Courtland Sutton	31	8	6
TE	Evan Engram	32	9	4
TE	Adam Trautman	29	6	4
LT	Garett Bolles	34	9	7
LG	Ben Powers	30	7	7
C	Luke Wattenberg	29	4	7
RG	Quinn Meinerz	28	5	7
RT	Mike McGlinchey	32	8	7
Defense
LDE	Zach Allen	29	7	7
DT	D. J. Jones	31	9	7
RDE	Eyioma Uwazurike	28	4	6
LOLB	Jonah Elliss	23	2	6
LILB	Alex Singleton	33	7	7
RILB	Justin Strnad	30	5	6
ROLB	Nik Bonitto	27	4	7
LCB	Patrick Surtain II	26	5	4
SS	Talanoa Hufanga	27	5	5
FS	Brandon Jones	28	6	7
RCB	Riley Moss	26	3	6

Source for this section: Pro-Football Reference.

=== Captains ===
Position	Player	Times captain
Offense
QB	Bo Nix	3
WR	Courtland Sutton	6
G	Quinn Meinerz	3
Defense
DT	D. J. Jones	2
ILB	Alex Singleton	4
CB	Patrick Surtain II	3
S	Talanoa Hufanga	2
Special Teams
K	Wil Lutz	3
ST	Devon Key	1

Source for this section: Denver Broncos.

== Awards and honors ==
=== NFL Top 100 ===
Rank	Player	Position	Change
10	Patrick Surtain II	CB	0
32	Nik Bonitto	OLB	▲6
42	Garett Bolles	T	NR
59	Bo Nix	QB	▲5
68	Courtland Sutton	WR	NR
73	Zach Allen	DE	▲17

=== Weekly ===
Week	Award(s)	Recipient	Source
3	AFC Defensive Player of the Week	S Talanoa Hufanga	
7	AFC Defensive Player of the Week	ILB Alex Singleton	

=== Monthly ===
Month	Award(s)	Recipient	Source
October	AFC Defensive Player of the Month	ILB Alex Singleton	

=== Yearly ===
Award(s)	Recipient	Source
NFLPA Alan Page Community Award	T Garett Bolles	
