= Paul Manning =

Paul Manning may refer to:

- Paul Manning (journalist) (died 1995), American broadcast journalist
- Paul Manning (police officer, born 1947), British police officer, Assistant Commissioner of Police of the Metropolis
- Paul Manning (TV producer) (1959–2005), American television producer
- Paul Manning (police officer, born 1973), British-born Canadian undercover police officer
- Paul Manning (cyclist) (born 1974), British track and road racing cyclist
- Paul Manning (ice hockey) (born 1979), Canadian ice hockey player
- Paul Manning (cricketer) (born 1990), Caymanian cricketer
- Paul Manning (American football) (born 2003), American football player
