= Katsis =

Katsis is a surname. Notable people with the surname include:

- Antonis Katsis (born 1989), Cypriot footballer
- Kolbe Katsis (born 2001), American football player
- Peter Katsis (1956/1957–2026), American music manager
