= Adam Prentice =

American football player (born 1997)

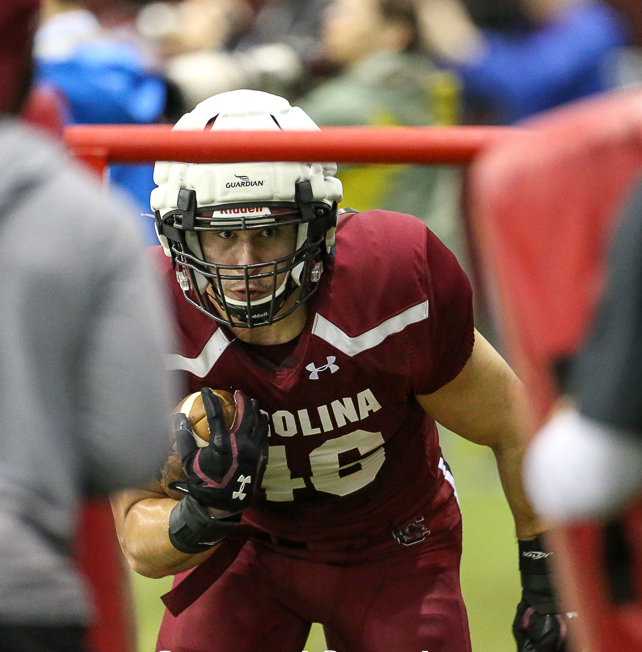
- Prentice with the South Carolina Gamecocks in 2020

No. 46 – Denver Broncos
- Position: Fullback
- Roster status: Active

Personal information
- Born: January 16, 1997 (age 29); Fresno, California, U.S.
- Listed height: 6 ft 0 in (1.83 m)
- Listed weight: 245 lb (111 kg)

Career information
- High school: Clovis (CA)
- College: Colorado State (2015–2019); South Carolina (2020)
- NFL draft: 2021: undrafted

Career history
- Denver Broncos (2021)*; New Orleans Saints (2021–2024); Denver Broncos (2025–present)
- * Offseason or practice squad member only

Career NFL statistics as of Week 10, 2026
- Rushing yards: 73
- Rushing average: 3.7
- Receptions: 16
- Receiving yards: 102
- Total tackles: 33
- Stats at Pro Football Reference

Adam M. Prentice (born January 16, 1997) is an American professional football fullback for the Denver Broncos of the National Football League (NFL). He played college football for the Colorado State Rams and South Carolina Gamecocks and was signed by the Broncos as an undrafted free agent in 2021. He has also played for the New Orleans Saints.

In addition to his usage as a fullback, Prentice has also occasionally played running back (halfback/tailback), often playing running back either as a situational ballcarrier or a pass blocker/pass protector.

== Early life ==
Prentice was born in Fresno on January 16, 1997, to Renae and Gary Prentice. He graduated from Clovis High in 2015, receiving the Bnai Brith award from Fresno County for his outstanding community service, excelling academically, in track, wrestling, and football. Prentice would place 5th in the Valley in the shot put, 2nd in the state in wrestling, and was the Fresno Bee defensive player of the year. Prentice would lose his father Gary suddenly to cancer his senior year at Clovis High. The memory of his father would inspire Prentice throughout college.

== College career ==
Prentice began his collegiate career at Colorado State. He join the team as a walk-on and redshirted his true freshman season. Prentice was named the Rams' starting fullback and awarded a scholarship before suffering a season-ending injury shortly before the start of his redshirt freshman season. Prentice served as Colorado State's primary fullback for the next three seasons before transferring to South Carolina as a graduate transfer. At South Carolina Prentice was named Offensive Player of the game in their historic victory vs Auburn. Prentice finished his masters in structural engineering at South Carolina.

== Professional career ==
Pre-draft measurables
Height	Weight	Arm length	Hand span	Wingspan	40-yard dash	10-yard split	20-yard split	20-yard shuttle	Three-cone drill	Vertical jump	Broad jump	Bench press
5 ft 11 1/2 in (1.82 m)	251 lb (114 kg)	32 in (0.81 m)	9 1/8 in (0.23 m)	6 ft 6 in (1.98 m)	4.83 s	1.68 s	2.75 s	4.58 s	7.22 s	35.5 in (0.90 m)	9 ft 8 in (2.95 m)	21 reps
All values from Pro Day

=== Denver Broncos (first stint) ===
Prentice was signed by the Denver Broncos as an undrafted free agent on May 3, 2021. He was waived by the Broncos on August 31.

=== New Orleans Saints ===
Prentice was claimed off of waivers by the New Orleans Saints on September 1, 2021. He was waived on September 14, and re-signed to the practice squad. Prentice was elevated to the active roster on November 25, for the team's Week 12 game against the Buffalo Bills and made his NFL debut in the game, starting at fullback and catching a pass from Trevor Siemian for ten yards for his first career reception. He was signed to the active roster on December 2. As a rookie, Prentice recorded 3 rushing attempts for 5 yards, 3 receptions on 3 targets for 16 yards, and 1 tackle. He appeared in 7 games and started 3.

Prentice made the Saints final roster in 2022, but was waived on October 1, 2022, and re-signed to the practice squad. He was promoted to the active roster on November 10. In 2022, Prentice recorded 4 rushing attempts for 9 yards, 3 receptions on 3 targets for 9 yards, 3 tackles, with 1 fumble.

On October 14, 2023, Prentice was placed on injured reserve. He was reactivated on November 11, waived three days later, and re-signed to the practice squad on November 16. He was promoted to the active roster on December 9. In 2023, Prentice recorded 2 rushing attempts for 12 yards, caught 2 of 3 targets for 12 receiving yards, 5 tackles, and 1 fumble. Prentice played in 13 games with 1 start in the 2023 season.

In the 2024 season Prentice recorded 0 receptions on 4 targets and recorded a career-high 7 tackles. He appeared in 17 games with 7 starts.

=== Denver Broncos (second stint) ===
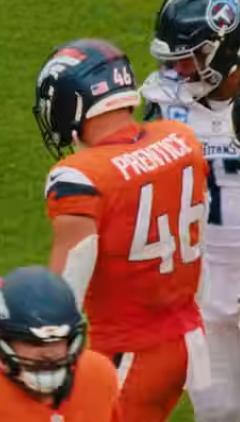
Prentice with the Broncos in 2025

On August 17, 2025, Prentice was signed by the Denver Broncos once again following injuries to fullbacks Michael Burton and Nate Adkins. On August 26, he was released. The next day, he was re-signed to the practice squad. With both Burton and Adkins out with injury, Prentice was elevated from the practice squad for the team's first three games of the season. On September 24, he was promoted to the active roster.

On March 12, 2026, Prentice re-signed with the Broncos on a one-year contract. He was released by the Broncos on August 30, but was re-signed to the practice squad a day later. Prentice was elevated to the active roster for three consecutive Weeks to start the season. On October 3, he was promoted to the active roster.

== NFL career statistics ==
Legend
**Bold**	Career high

=== Regular season ===
Year	Team	Games		Rushing					Receiving					Tackles			Fumbles	
Year	Team	GP	GS	Att	Yds	Avg	Lng	TD	Rec	Yds	Avg	Lng	TD	Cmb	Solo	Ast	Fum	Lost
2021	NO	7	3	3	5	1.7	2	0	3	16	5.3	10	0	1	1	0	0	0
2022	NO	11	2	4	9	2.3	3	0	3	9	3.0	4	0	3	3	0	**1**	0
2023	NO	13	1	2	12	**6.0**	7	0	2	12	6.0	7	0	5	1	4	**1**	**1**
2024	NO	17	7	0	0	0.0	0	0	0	0	0.0	0	0	7	**5**	2	0	0
2025	DEN	17	3	**10**	**44**	4.4	**18**	0	**6**	**53**	**8.8**	**14**	0	**11**	3	**8**	0	0
Career		65	16	19	70	3.7	18	0	14	90	6.4	14	0	27	13	14	2	1

=== Postseason ===
Year	Team	Games		Rushing					Receiving					Tackles			Fumbles	
Year	Team	GP	GS	Att	Yds	Avg	Lng	TD	Rec	Yds	Avg	Lng	TD	Cmb	Solo	Ast	Fum	Lost
2025	DEN	2	0	1	3	3.0	3	0	0	0	0.0	0	0	0	0	0	0	0
Career		2	0	1	3	3.0	3	0	0	0	0.0	0	0	0	0	0	0	0
