= Garrett Nelson =

American football player (born 2000)

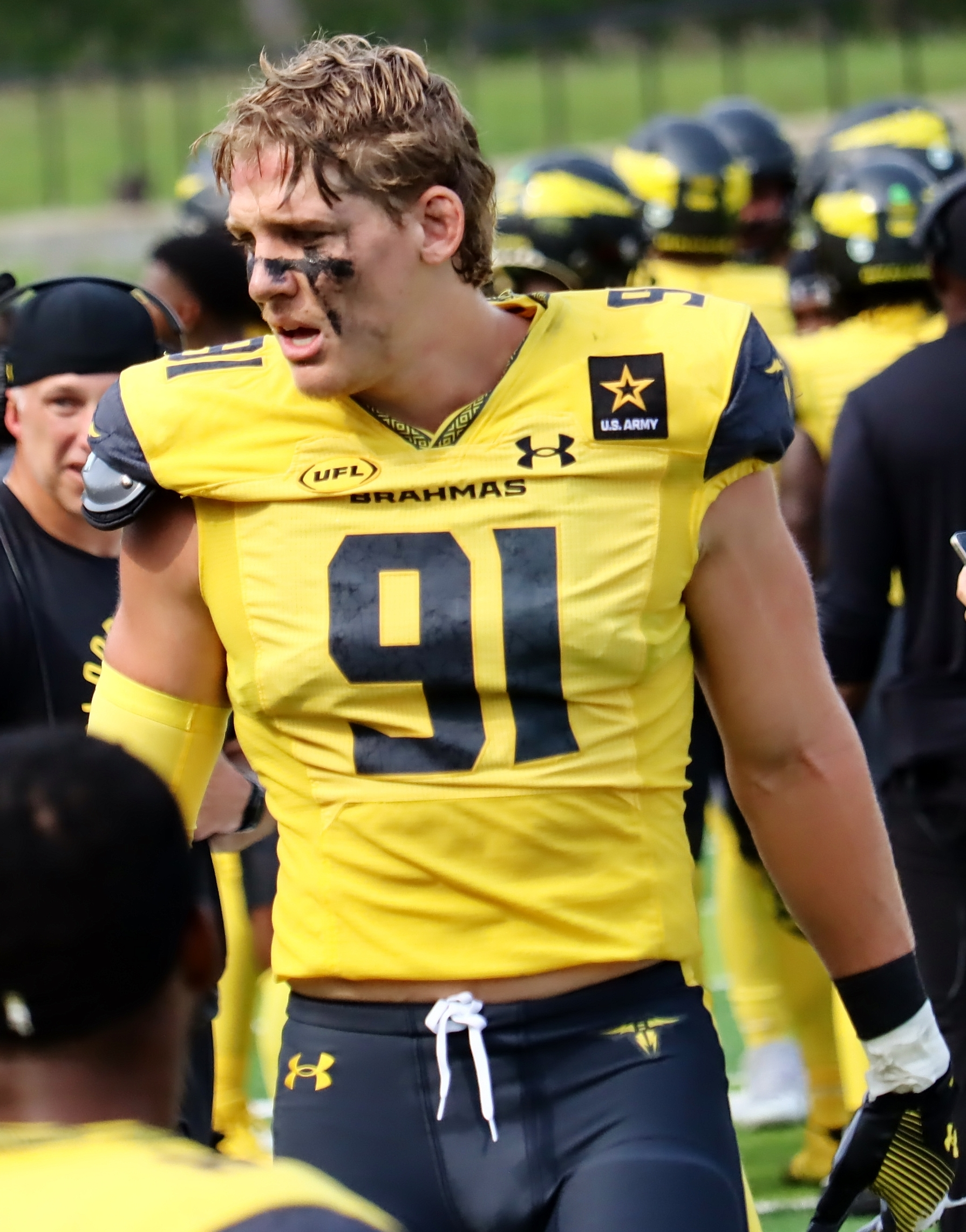
- Nelson with the San Antonio Brahmas in 2024

Profile
- Position: Linebacker

Personal information
- Born: March 1, 2000 (age 26); Scottsbluff, Nebraska, U.S.
- Listed height: 6 ft 4 in (1.93 m)
- Listed weight: 249 lb (113 kg)

Career information
- High school: Scottsbluff High School (Scottsbluff, Nebraska)
- College: Nebraska (2019–2022)
- NFL draft: 2023: undrafted

Career history
- Miami Dolphins (2023)*; Cincinnati Bengals (2023)*; San Antonio Brahmas (2024–2025); Denver Broncos (2025)*; New Orleans Saints (2025)*; Denver Broncos (2025)*; Seattle Seahawks (2026)*; New Orleans Saints (2026)*; Los Angeles Rams (2026)*
- * Offseason or practice squad member only

Awards and highlights
- Second-team All-Big Ten (2022)
- Stats at Pro Football Reference

Garrett Nelson (born March 1, 2000) is an American professional football linebacker. He played college football for the Nebraska Cornhuskers and was signed by the Miami Dolphins as an undrafted free agent in 2023. He has also played for the San Antonio Brahmas of the United Football League (UFL).

== Early life ==
Nelson was born on March 1, 2000, to Chris and Holli Nelson. While attending Scottsbluff High School, he played defensive end for the football team. Across three seasons, Nelson recorded 150 tackles, 26 tackles-for-loss, and 18 sacks. He was a finalist for the 2018 high school Butkus Award, and was named to the Nebraska All-State team. As a three-star recruit coming out of high school, he committed to playing college football at Nebraska.

== College career ==
In 2019, Nelson played in 11 games and logged 15 tackles playing at outside linebacker. In 2020, he totaled 30 tackles, four tackles-for-loss, and one and a half sacks in eight starts. Nelson started every game in 2021, posting 57 tackles, 11.5 tackles-for-loss, and five sacks. During his final year of college in 2022, Nelson had a career-high 65 tackles, nine tackles-for-loss, and five and a half sacks in addition to two passes deflected, two fumble recoveries, and a forced fumble.

== Professional career ==
Pre-draft measurables
Height	Weight	Arm length	Hand span	Wingspan	40-yard dash	10-yard split	20-yard split	20-yard shuttle	Three-cone drill	Vertical jump	Broad jump	Bench press
6 ft 3 1/4 in (1.91 m)	248 lb (112 kg)	31 5/8 in (0.80 m)	9 5/8 in (0.24 m)	6 ft 6 3/4 in (2.00 m)	4.93 s	1.66 s	2.77 s	4.18 s	7.24 s	35.0 in (0.89 m)	9 ft 7 in (2.92 m)	22 reps
All values from Pro Day

=== Miami Dolphins ===
After going unselected in the 2023 NFL draft, Nelson was signed by the Miami Dolphins as an undrafted free agent on May 12, 2023. On August 28, Nelson was released by the Dolphins during final preseason roster cuts.

=== Cincinnati Bengals ===
On September 6, Nelson signed with the Cincinnati Bengals' practice squad. On September 23, Nelson was released from the practice squad.

=== San Antonio Brahmas ===
Nelson was a member of the UFL's San Antonio Brahmas during the 2024 and 2025 seasons, logging 24 tackles, three tackles-for-loss, two and a half sacks, and two forced fumbles over the course of seventeen games played.

=== Denver Broncos (first stint) ===
On July 31, 2025, Nelson was signed by the Denver Broncos following an injury to Johnny Walker Jr. On August 26, he was waived as a part of final roster cutdowns.

=== New Orleans Saints (first stint) ===
On September 4, Nelson signed to the Saints' practice squad after an injury to Chase Young. On October 7, Nelson's practice squad contract was terminated.

=== Denver Broncos (second stint) ===
On October 14, Nelson signed with the Broncos' practice squad. On October 28, Nelson was released from the practice squad. Two weeks later, he was signed back onto the practice squad. On January 19, 2026, he was released from the practice squad again. On January 27, Nelson signed a reserve/futures contract with the Broncos. On May 8, he was waived by the Broncos.

=== Seattle Seahawks ===
On August 4, 2026, Nelson signed with the Seattle Seahawks. He was waived the next day.

=== New Orleans Saints (second stint) ===
On August 7, 2026, Nelson was claimed off waivers by the New Orleans Saints. He was waived by the Saints as a part of preliminary roster cuts on August 29.

=== Los Angeles Rams ===
On October 14, 2026, Nelson signed with the Los Angeles Rams practice squad. On November 3, he was released.

== Personal life ==
Nelson's father was a two-time All-American college wrestler at Nebraska.
