= Miles Scott (American football) =

American football player (born 2002)

No. 39 – Denver Broncos
- Position: Safety
- Roster status: Practice squad

Personal information
- Born: March 28, 2002 (age 24); Dolton, Illinois, U.S.
- Listed height: 5 ft 11 in (1.80 m)
- Listed weight: 210 lb (95 kg)

Career information
- High school: St. Thomas More (Oakdale, Connecticut)
- College: Illinois (2021–2025)
- NFL draft: 2026: 7th round, 246th overall pick

Career history
- Denver Broncos (2026–present)*
- * Offseason or practice squad member only
- Stats at Pro Football Reference

Miles Scott (born March 28, 2002) is an American professional football safety for the Denver Broncos of the National Football League (NFL). He played college football for the Illinois Fighting Illini and was selected by the Broncos in the seventh round of the 2026 NFL draft.

== Early life ==
Scott was born on March 28, 2002, and is from Chicago, Illinois. He played football for the first time at age five. He attended St. Laurence High School before transferring to St. Thomas More School in Connecticut as a senior, playing football as a wide receiver. Scott walked-on to play college football for the Illinois Fighting Illini as a wide receiver over offers from several FCS-level teams.

== College career ==
Scott redshirted as a true freshman at Illinois in 2021, appearing in four games. He then appeared in 13 games during the 2022 season and caught four passes for 29 yards. Scott changed his position to defensive back prior to the 2023 season and won a starting role at safety, returning an interception 48 yards for a touchdown in his first game at the position. Scott totaled 63 tackles and two interceptions while starting all 12 games during the 2023 season. He served as team captain in his final two years, posting 55 tackles, six passes defended and two interceptions in 2024, and 64 tackles, seven passes defended and three interceptions in 2025. At the conclusion of his collegiate career, he received an invite to the 2026 East–West Shrine Bowl. While attending Illinois, Scott appeared in a total of 55 games with 37 starts as a defensive back.

== Professional career ==
Pre-draft measurables
Height	Weight	Arm length	Hand span	Wingspan	40-yard dash	10-yard split	20-yard split	20-yard shuttle	Three-cone drill	Vertical jump	Broad jump	Bench press
6 ft 0 1/4 in (1.84 m)	203 lb (92 kg)	31 in (0.79 m)	10 3/8 in (0.26 m)	6 ft 4 1/2 in (1.94 m)	4.62 s	1.63 s	2.62 s	4.12 s	7.09 s	37.5 in (0.95 m)	10 ft 3 in (3.12 m)	18 reps
All values from Pro Day

Scott was selected by the Denver Broncos in the seventh round (246th overall) of the 2026 NFL draft. On May 7, 2026, Scott signed his four-year rookie contract. On August 30, he was waived by the Broncos as a part of final roster cuts. Scott was re-signed to the team's practice squad the next day.
