= Caleb Lohner =

American football player (born 2001)

No. 84 – Denver Broncos
- Position: Tight end
- Roster status: Injured reserve/designated for return

Personal information
- Born: October 1, 2001 (age 25); Flower Mound, Texas, U.S.
- Listed height: 6 ft 7 in (2.01 m)
- Listed weight: 250 lb (113 kg)

Career information
- High school: Wasatch Academy (Mount Pleasant, Utah)
- College: BYU (2020–2021); Baylor (2022–2023); Utah (2024)
- NFL draft: 2025: 7th round, 241st overall pick

Career history
- Denver Broncos (2025–present)
- Stats at Pro Football Reference

Caleb Lohner (born October 1, 2001) is an American professional football tight end for the Denver Broncos of the National Football League (NFL). He played college basketball for the BYU Cougars and Baylor Bears before switching to playing college football upon transferring to the Utah Utes. Lohner was selected by the Broncos in the seventh round of the 2025 NFL draft.

== Early life ==
Lohner attended Flower Mound High School in Flower Mound, Texas for two years before he transferred to Wasatch Academy in Utah for his junior and senior years.

== College career ==
=== BYU ===
Lohner started his college career at Brigham Young University in 2020, where his father had played basketball. As a freshman basketball player, he averaged 2.8 points per game and was named to the West Coast Conference All-Freshman Team.

=== Baylor ===
Lohner transferred to Baylor in 2022 to play basketball. Lohner played for the Bears for two seasons appearing in 69 games averaging 2.8 points and 2.8 rebounds per game.

=== Utah ===
Lohner transferred to play for the Utah Utes to play college football. In 2024, he hauled in four passes for 54 yards and four touchdowns.

He also played one year of basketball with Utah in 2024–25; Lohner averaged 2.8 points, 2.0 rebounds, and 0.7 assists per game.

== Professional career ==
Pre-draft measurables
Height	Weight	Arm length	Hand span	40-yard dash	10-yard split	20-yard split	20-yard shuttle	Three-cone drill	Vertical jump	Broad jump	Bench press
6 ft 7 1/4 in (2.01 m)	256 lb (116 kg)	32 in (0.81 m)	9 1/2 in (0.24 m)	4.69 s	1.70 s	2.78 s	4.53 s	7.15 s	37.0 in (0.94 m)	10 ft 6 in (3.20 m)	19 reps
All values from Pro Day

Lohner was selected by the Denver Broncos in the seventh round (241st overall) of the 2025 NFL draft. On May 6, Lohner signed a four-year contract worth $4.309 million. On August 26, he was waived by the Broncos. The next day, he was re-signed to the practice squad. Prior to the Divisional Round matchup against the Buffalo Bills, Lohner was elevated to the active roster but was designated as inactive for the game itself. On January 26, 2026, Lohner signed a futures contract with the Broncos.

Despite impressing as a veteran participant in rookie minicamp, it was announced on June 9 that Lohner would miss OTAs and mandatory minicamp due to a cleanup surgery on a lower-body injury. He continued to be sidelined during training camp and the preseason, and was placed on injured reserve with a designation to return on August 30. On November 18, the Broncos opened his 21-day practice window.

== Personal life ==
In his spare time, Lohner enjoys playing the guitar and surfing.
