= Brent Austin =

American football player (born 2003)

No. 33 – Denver Broncos
- Position: Cornerback
- Roster status: Practice squad

Personal information
- Born: December 19, 2003 (age 22); San Bernardino, California, U.S.
- Listed height: 5 ft 11 in (1.80 m)
- Listed weight: 180 lb (82 kg)

Career information
- High school: Cajon (San Bernardino, California)
- College: James Madison (2022–2023); South Florida (2024); California (2025)
- NFL draft: 2026: undrafted

Career history
- Denver Broncos (2026–present)

Awards and highlights
- Third-team All-ACC (2025)
- Stats at Pro Football Reference

Brent "Paco" Austin (born December 19, 2003) is an American professional football cornerback for the Denver Broncos of the National Football League (NFL). He played college football for the James Madison Dukes, South Florida Bulls, and California Golden Bears. Austin was signed by the Broncos as an undrafted free agent in 2026.

== Early life ==
Austin was born on December 19, 2003, to Blaze and Christina Austin.

Austin initially attended Aquinas High School, where he played football as a two-way player at cornerback and wide receiver. In 2018, he aided them in achieving a 10–2 record and a league championship.

Austin later transferred Cajon High School in his senior year, where he helped the football team win the CIF regional championship in 2021. In addition to football, Austin was also a track and field athlete, qualifying for the DI CIF in the 100-meter dash and ranking #4 in California in the 4×100 relay. Coming out of high school, Austin was a zero-star recruit.

== College career ==
=== James Madison ===
In March 2022, Madison received an offer from James Madison Dukes head coach Curt Cignetti, and he committed to James Madison shortly thereafter. During the 2022 season, he played in five games, recording eight total tackles. He saw in increased role the next year, playing in 11 games and posting 12 tackles and one pass deflection, as well as an 81-yard pick six against the University of Connecticut on November 11, 2023, for his first college career interception.

=== South Florida ===
Following Cignetti's departure from James Madison to coach the Indiana Hoosiers, Austin transferred to the University of South Florida. Starting in all 13 games for the Bulls in 2024, Austin logged a career-high 48 tackles, two interceptions, and a team-leading 10 pass deflections.

=== California ===
After being highly sought-after in the transfer portal, Austin returned to his home state to play for the California Golden Bears. He cited to school's track record of developing future NFL defensive backs such as Nnamdi Asomugha and Camryn Bynum as a major reason behind his decision to play for California. During the 2025 season, he once again started in all 13 games, this time recording 42 tackles, 13 pass deflections, two forced fumbles and a half sack. Due to his standout season, Austin was named to the All-Atlantic Coast Conference third-team.

Austin later garnered significant attention from NFL teams at the 2026 East–West Shrine Bowl, demonstrating proficiency in coverage ability, tackling technique, and play recognition.

== Professional career ==
Pre-draft measurables
Height	Weight	Arm length	Hand span	Wingspan	40-yard dash	10-yard split	20-yard split	20-yard shuttle	Three-cone drill	Vertical jump	Broad jump
5 ft 11 in (1.80 m)	180 lb (82 kg)	30 1/4 in (0.77 m)	8 1/8 in (0.21 m)	6 ft 2 1/8 in (1.88 m)	4.49 s	1.56 s	2.59 s	4.54 s	7.28 s	31.5 in (0.80 m)	10 ft 4 in (3.15 m)
All values from Pro Day

=== Denver Broncos ===
After going unselected in the 2026 NFL draft, Austin drew interest from multiple teams as an undrafted free agent. He eventually signed with the Denver Broncos on May 8, 2026. On August 30, Austin was waived by the Broncos as a part of final roster cuts. The next day, he was re-signed to the team's practice squad. Austin was elevated to the active roster for the Broncos' Week 5 matchup against the Los Angeles Chargers, but did not end up playing any snaps.

== Personal life ==
Austin has Mexican heritage, and received the Spanish-language nickname "Paco" from his father as a child. His younger brother Brayden played college football as a wide receiver for Citrus College. He has two sisters, Kaylah and Cassandra.
