= Jahfari Harvey =

American football player (born 2001)

Rhode Island Breakers
- Position: Outside linebacker
- Roster status: Unsigned draft pick

Personal information
- Born: May 2, 2001 (age 25); Port St. Lucie, Florida, U.S.
- Listed height: 6 ft 2 in (1.88 m)
- Listed weight: 255 lb (116 kg)

Career information
- High school: Vero Beach (Vero Beach, Florida)
- College: Miami (2019–2023); SMU (2024)
- NFL draft: 2025: undrafted

Career history
- Las Vegas Raiders (2025); Denver Broncos (2026)*; Rhode Island Breakers (2027-present)
- * Offseason or practice squad member only

Career NFL statistics as of 2025
- Games played: 2
- Tackles: 1
- Pass deflections: 1
- Stats at Pro Football Reference

Jahfari Harvey (born May 2, 2001) is an American professional football outside linebacker. He played college football for the Miami Hurricanes and SMU Mustangs and was signed by the Las Vegas Raiders as an undrafted free agent in 2025.

== Early life ==
Harvey was born on May 2, 2001, and grew up in Port St. Lucie, Florida. He first attended John Carroll High School in Fort Pierce, where he played defensive end and outside linebacker. As a junior in 2017, he tallied 91 tackles and 12 sacks while scoring two defensive touchdowns. He played his senior year at Vero Beach High School, posting 85 tackles, 18.5 tackles-for-loss (TFLs) and 7.5 sacks. A four-star recruit, Harvey was ranked by Rivals.com as the 11th-best defensive end prospect nationally, and he committed to play college football for the Miami Hurricanes.

== College career ==
Harvey redshirted as a true freshman at Miami in 2019, recording one tackle. He then posted 18 tackles, five TFLs and 1.5 sacks while playing in 10 games in 2020. He entered the 2021 season as a starter. That season, Harvey appeared in 12 games, five as a starter, and recorded 26 tackles, 6.5 TFLs and 2.5 sacks. He recorded 31 tackles, 7.5 TFLs and 5.5 sacks in 2022, then had 23 tackles, 2.5 TFLs and one sack in 2023. Harvey transferred to the SMU Mustangs for the 2024 season, posting 31 tackles, 12.5 TFLs and 7.5 sacks to conclude his career. In his collegiate career, he posted 130 tackles, 22 TFLs and 18.0 sacks in 64 games.

== Professional career ==
Pre-draft measurables
Height	Weight	Arm length	Hand span	Wingspan	Vertical jump	Broad jump	Bench press
6 ft 2 1/2 in (1.89 m)	255 lb (116 kg)	32 3/4 in (0.83 m)	9 3/4 in (0.25 m)	6 ft 6 1/2 in (1.99 m)	31.5 in (0.80 m)	10 ft 2 in (3.10 m)	20 reps
All values from Pro Day

=== Las Vegas Raiders ===
After going unselected in the 2025 NFL draft, Harvey signed with the Las Vegas Raiders as an undrafted free agent. He was waived on August 26, 2025, at the final roster cuts, then re-signed to the practice squad the following day. He was signed to the active roster on December 17, but then waived two days later, before being re-signed to the practice squad on December 22. Harvey was signed to the active roster again on December 27.

On August 30, 2026, Harvey was waived by the Raiders as a part of final roster cuts; he was re-signed to the team's practice squad the following day. On September 3, following the signing of Azeez Ojulari, Harvey was released by Las Vegas.

=== Denver Broncos ===
On September 29, 2026, Harvey was signed to the Denver Broncos' practice squad. On October 6, he was released.

== NFL career statistics ==
=== Regular season ===
Year	Team	Games		Tackles					Interceptions						Fumbles				
Year	Team	GP	GS	Cmb	Solo	Ast	Sck	TFL	Int	Yds	Avg	Lng	TD	PD	FF	Fum	FR	Yds	TD
2025	LV	2	0	1	0	1	0.0	0	0	0	0.0	0	0	1	0	0	0	0	0
Career		2	0	1	0	1	0.0	0	0	0	0.0	0	0	1	0	0	0	0	0

== Personal life ==
While at Miami, Harvey owned two pythons, including a three-foot long ball python named Yak, as well as a four-foot long mangrove monitor he named Psycho.
