= Gavin Ortega =

American football player (born 2004)

No. 68 – Denver Broncos
- Position: Guard
- Roster status: Practice squad

Personal information
- Born: April 29, 2004 (age 22); Bellingham, Washington, U.S.
- Listed height: 6 ft 5 in (1.96 m)
- Listed weight: 300 lb (136 kg)

Career information
- High school: Sehome (Bellingham, Washington)
- College: Weber State (2022–2025)
- NFL draft: 2026: undrafted

Career history
- Denver Broncos (2026–present)

Awards and highlights
- First-team All-Big Sky (2025); Second-team All-Big Sky (2024)
- Stats at Pro Football Reference

Gavin Ortega (born April 29, 2004) is an American professional football guard for the Denver Broncos of the National Football League (NFL). He played college football for the Weber State Wildcats and was signed by the Broncos as an undrafted free agent in 2026.

== Early life ==
Ortega was born on April 29, 2004, to BJ and Marjorie Ortega. He attended Sehome High School in Bellingham, Washington, where he played both football and basketball. Rated as three-star recruit, Ortega received offers from a number of schools, including Eastern Washington University and Weber State University. He eventually committed to Weber State in December 2021.

== College career ==
In college, Ortega played at left tackle, left guard, and right tackle. During his freshman year in 2022, he played in six games. In 2023, Ortega saw increased playing time as a starter, playing in 11 games and making 10 starts. In 2024, he started all 12 games at left guard, and was also voted a team captain by his teammates. Ortega subsequently earned second-team All-Big Sky Conference honors. In 2025, he once again started in all 12 games and was voted a captain. Led by Ortega, the Wildcats' offensive line allowed just 14 sacks, the fewest in the Big Sky that year. Following his senior year, Ortega was named to the All-Big Sky first-team.

== Professional career ==
Pre-draft measurables
Height	Weight	Arm length	Hand span	Wingspan	40-yard dash	10-yard split	20-yard split	20-yard shuttle	Three-cone drill	Vertical jump	Broad jump	Bench press
6 ft 5 in (1.96 m)	304 lb (138 kg)	33 in (0.84 m)	10 in (0.25 m)	6 ft 9 5/8 in (2.07 m)	5.10 s	1.76 s	2.96 s	4.69 s	7.51 s	30.0 in (0.76 m)	9 ft 3 in (2.82 m)	24 reps
All values from Pro Day

Heading into the 2026 NFL draft, Ortega garnered attention as an FCS prospect due to his technique and hand placement in addition to his athleticism, with him logging a relative athletic score (RAS) of 8.76.

=== Denver Broncos ===
After going unselected in the draft, Ortega signed with the Denver Broncos as an undrafted free agent on May 8, 2026. Prior to the draft, the Broncos had hosted him for a top-30 visit on April 14. On August 30, Ortega was waived by the Broncos as a part of final roster cuts. The next day, he was re-signed to their practice squad. On October 31, Ortega was elevated to the active roster ahead of a Week 8 game against the Kansas City Chiefs, but was a gameday inactive.
