= Israel Antwine =

American football player (born 2000)

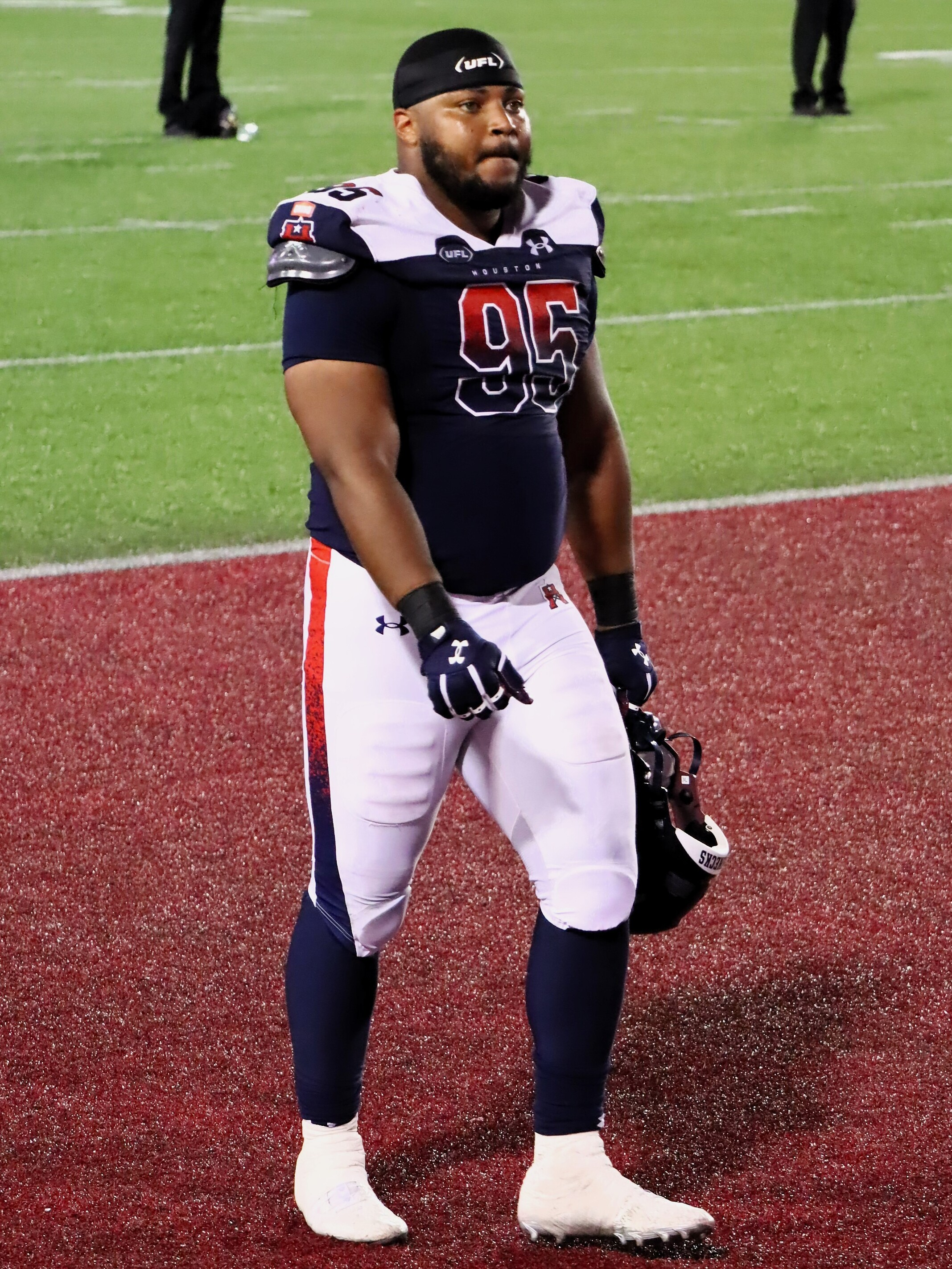
- Antwine with the Houston Roughnecks in 2025

Profile
- Position: Defensive tackle

Personal information
- Born: March 27, 2000 (age 26); Oklahoma City, Oklahoma, U.S.
- Listed height: 6 ft 3 in (1.91 m)
- Listed weight: 327 lb (148 kg)

Career information
- High school: Millwood; (Oklahoma City, Oklahoma)
- College: Colorado (2018); Oklahoma State (2019–2021)
- NFL draft: 2022: undrafted

Career history
- Jacksonville Jaguars (2022)*; Montreal Alouettes (2023); Massachusetts Pirates (2024); Houston Roughnecks / Gamblers (2025–2026); Denver Broncos (2026)*
- * Offseason or practice squad member only

Awards and highlights
- Grey Cup champion (2023)
- Stats at Pro Football Reference

Israel Antwine (born March 27, 2000) is an American professional football defensive tackle. He played college football for the Colorado Buffaloes and Oklahoma State Cowboys, and signed with the Jacksonville Jaguars as an undrafted free agent in 2022. He has also played for the Montreal Alouettes of the Canadian Football League (CFL), the Massachusetts Pirates of the Indoor Football League (IFL), and the Houston Gamblers of the United Football League (UFL).

== Early life ==
Antwine grew up in Oklahoma City, Oklahoma and attended Millwood High School where he lettered in football and powerlifting. He was rated a three-star recruit and committed to play college football at Colorado over offers from schools such as Arkansas, Baylor, Georgia, Iowa State, Missouri, TCU, Texas and Tech Tech.

== College career ==
=== Colorado ===
During Antwine's true freshman season in 2018, he played in all 12 games and started 11 of them. He finished the season with 15 tackles and five solo stops.

On January 12, 2019, Antwan announced that he would be transferring to Oklahoma State.

=== Oklahoma State ===
During the 2019 season, he played in 10 games and started nine of them and finished the season with 25 tackles, 14 solo stops and three quarterback hurries. During the 2020 season, he played in all 11 games and started six of them while on the interior of the defensive line. He finished the season with 20 tackles, five tackles for loss, two quarterback hurries and a forced fumble. During the 2021 season, he played in 13 games and started the last 10 games. He finished the season with 4.0 tackles for loss, 3.0 sacks and two quarterback hurries.

He finished his career at Oklahoma State with 29 solo stops, 65 tackles, 13 tackles for loss and 6 sacks.

== Professional career ==
Pre-draft measurables
| Height | Weight | Arm length | Hand span | Wingspan | 40-yard dash | 10-yard split | 20-yard split | 20-yard shuttle | Three-cone drill | Vertical jump | Broad jump | Bench press |
|---|---|---|---|---|---|---|---|---|---|---|---|---|
| 6 ft 2 3/4 in (1.90 m) | 309 lb (140 kg) | 33 in (0.84 m) | 10 in (0.25 m) | 6 ft 7 5/8 in (2.02 m) | 5.05 s | 1.75 s | 2.84 s | 4.59 s | 7.96 s | 27.5 in (0.70 m) | 9 ft 2 in (2.79 m) | 28 reps |
All values from Pro Day

=== Jacksonville Jaguars ===
On April 30, 2022, Antwine was signed to the Jacksonville Jaguars as an undrafted free agent after going unselected in the 2022 NFL draft. Antwine was waived on August 30, but was re–signed to the practice squad the next day. He was released by Jacksonville on October 11.

=== Montreal Alouettes ===
On March 26, 2023, it was announced that Antwine had signed with the Montreal Alouettes of the Canadian Football League (CFL). He was released by the Alouettes on January 24, 2024.

=== Massachusetts Pirates ===
On May 23, 2024, Antwine signed with the Massachusetts Pirates of the Indoor Football League (IFL).

=== Houston Roughnecks ===
On March 11, 2025, Antwine signed with the Houston Roughnecks of the United Football League (UFL).

=== Houston Gamblers ===
On January 13, 2026, Antwine was selected onto the Houston Gamblers Reserve List of the United Football League (UFL).

=== Denver Broncos ===
On August 26, 2026, Antwine was signed by the Denver Broncos. On August 30, he was waived by the Broncos.
