= Eyioma Uwazurike =

American football player (born 1998)

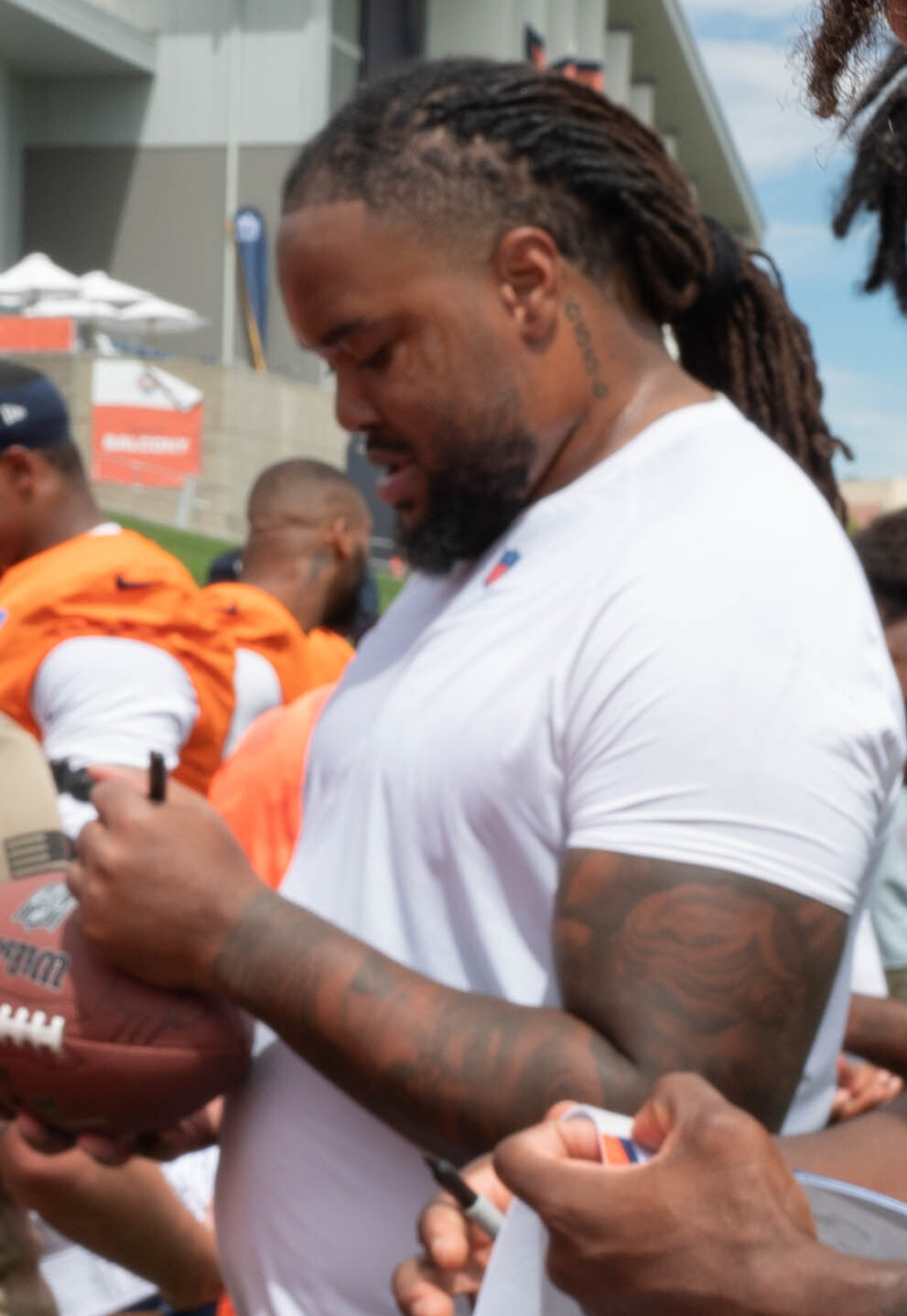
- Uwazurike with the Denver Broncos in 2024

No. 96 – Denver Broncos
- Position: Defensive end
- Roster status: Injured reserve

Personal information
- Born: May 6, 1998 (age 28); Detroit, Michigan, U.S.
- Listed height: 6 ft 6 in (1.98 m)
- Listed weight: 320 lb (145 kg)

Career information
- High school: Southfield-Lathrup (Lathrup Village, Michigan)
- College: Iowa State (2016–2021)
- NFL draft: 2022: 4th round, 116th overall pick

Career history
- Denver Broncos (2022–present)

Awards and highlights
- First-team All-Big 12 (2021)

Career NFL statistics as of Week 18, 2025
- Total tackles: 67
- Sacks: 4
- Pass deflections: 1
- Stats at Pro Football Reference

Eyioma "Enyi" Uwazurike (/ɛnˈjoʊmə uːwˈɑːzʊrˌiːkeɪ/ en-YOH-mə oo-WAZ-zur-EE-kay; born May 6, 1998) is an American professional football defensive end for the Denver Broncos of the National Football League (NFL). He played college football for the Iowa State Cyclones.

== Early life ==
Uwazurike grew up in Detroit, Michigan and attended Southfield-Lathrup High School.

== College career ==
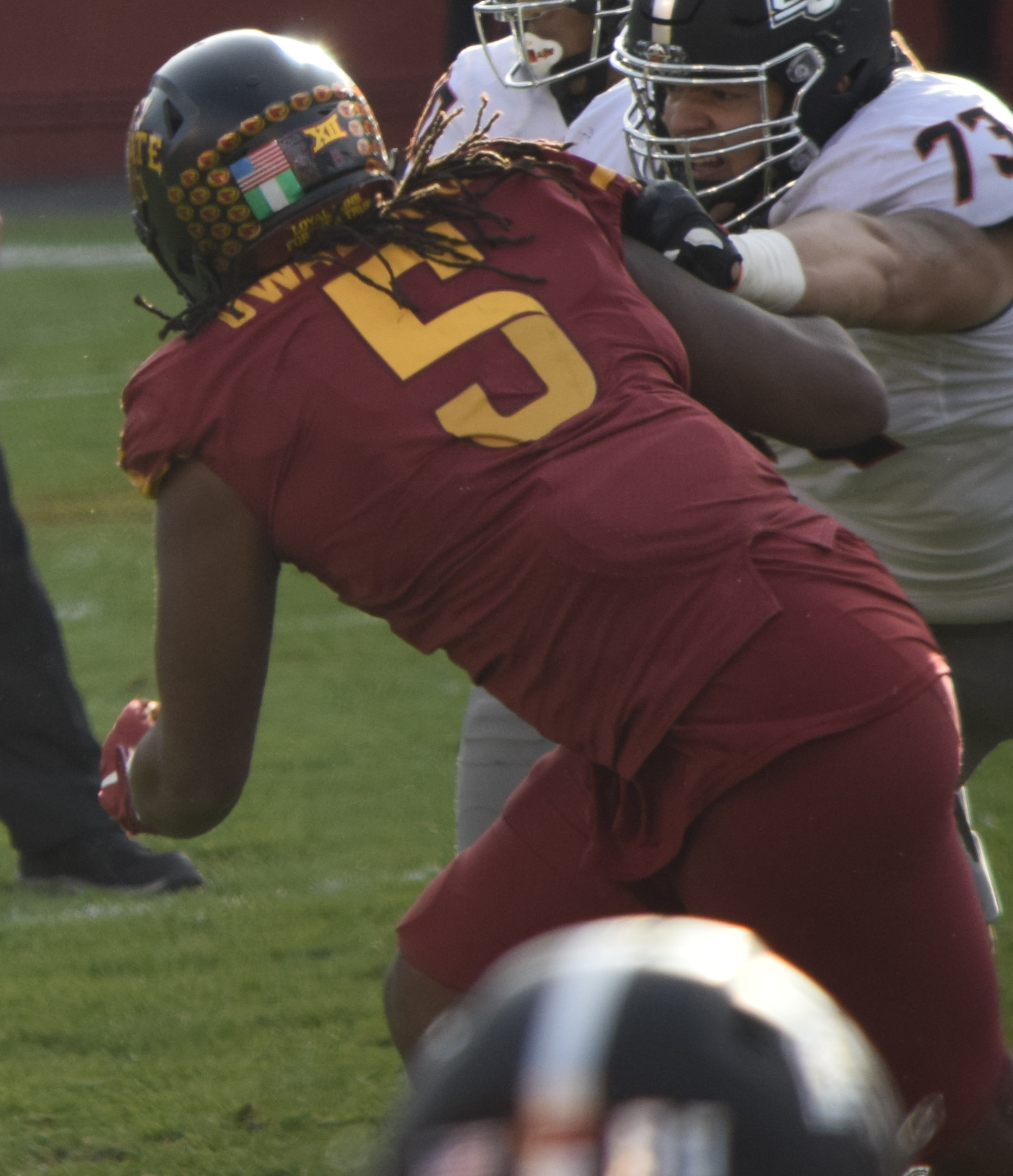
Uwazurike with the Iowa State Cyclones in 2019

Uwazurike redshirted his true freshman season due to academics. He became a starter during his redshirt sophomore season and had 27 tackles, 5.0 tackles for loss, and one sack. In his first full season as a starter, Uwazurike recorded 32 tackles, 5.5 tackles for loss, and 1.5 sacks and was named honorable mention All-Big 12 Conference. He was again named honorable mention All-Big 12 as a redshirt senior after finishing the season with 27 tackles, eight tackles, and three sacks. Uwazurike decided to utilize the extra year of eligibility granted to college athletes who played in the 2020 season due to the coronavirus pandemic and return to Iowa State for a sixth season. He was named first-team in his final season after finishing the year with 43 tackles, 12 tackles for loss, and nine sacks.

== Professional career ==
Pre-draft measurables
Height	Weight	Arm length	Hand span	Wingspan	40-yard dash	10-yard split	20-yard split	20-yard shuttle	Three-cone drill	Vertical jump	Broad jump	Bench press
6 ft 6 1/8 in (1.98 m)	316 lb (143 kg)	35 1/8 in (0.89 m)	10 1/8 in (0.26 m)	7 ft 0 3/4 in (2.15 m)	5.32 s	1.82 s	3.00 s	4.75 s	7.58 s	33.0 in (0.84 m)	8 ft 11 in (2.72 m)	23 reps
All values from NFL Combine/Pro Day

Uwazurike was selected by the Denver Broncos in the fourth round (116th overall) of the 2022 NFL draft, a pick the Broncos received from the Russell Wilson trade.

On July 24, 2023, Uwazurike was suspended indefinitely for gambling violations.

Uwazurike was reinstated by the NFL on August 5, 2024. After playing intermittently during the 2024 season, Uwazurike saw an increased role in 2025 as a rotational defensive lineman.

On November 7, 2026, he was placed on injured reserve.

== Personal life ==
Uwazurike's family originates from the Biafra region of Nigeria.
