= Paul Manning (American football) =

American football player (born 2003)

Profile
- Position: Cornerback

Personal information
- Born: December 11, 2003 (age 22)
- Listed height: 6 ft 0 in (1.83 m)
- Listed weight: 188 lb (85 kg)

Career information
- High school: West Monroe (West Monroe, Louisiana)
- College: Henderson State (2022–2025)
- NFL draft: 2026: undrafted

Career history
- Denver Broncos (2026)*
- * Offseason or practice squad member only

Awards and highlights
- Second-team All-GAC (2025)

Paul Manning (born December 11, 2003) is an American professional football cornerback. He played college football for the Henderson State Reddies and was signed by the Denver Broncos as an undrafted free agent in 2026.

== Early life ==
Manning was born on December 11, 2003, to Curtis and Sharon Manning. While attending West Monroe High School, he played on both the basketball and football teams. During high school, he was a mainstay as one of West Monroe's starting cornerbacks, and was named a first-team All-District player as a senior in 2021.

== College career ==
Manning committed to play Division II college football at Henderson State University in Arkadelphia, Arkansas. As a freshman in 2022, Manning played in five games, recording eight tackles and three pass deflections. In 2023, he played in six games and started in one, logging six tackles, one tackle-for-loss, one pass deflection, one forced fumble, one fumble recovery, and one interception that he returned for a touchdown. In 2024, he played in 10 games and started in five, accruing 13 tackles, two pass deflections, and an interception. He had a breakout year as a primary starter in 2025, posting 24 tackles, two tackles-for-loss, one sack, 10 pass deflections, one interception, and two forced fumbles across 11 games started. He was subsequently named to the All-Great American Conference second-team.

== Professional career ==
Pre-draft measurables
Height	Weight	Arm length	Hand span	Wingspan	40-yard dash
6 ft 0 in (1.83 m)	188 lb (85 kg)	31 1/8 in (0.79 m)	7 5/8 in (0.19 m)	6 ft 1 5/8 in (1.87 m)	4.48 s
All values from Pro Day

After going unselected in the 2026 NFL draft, Manning became an undrafted free agent.

=== Denver Broncos ===
Manning did not initially sign with a team, instead participating in the Denver Broncos' rookie minicamp as a tryout. Following the conclusion of minicamp, he was signed by the Broncos on May 12, 2026. On June 16, Manning was waived with an injury settlement in order to make room on the roster for Sean Fresch Jr.

Manning later had a tryout with the New York Jets, but was not signed. He subsequently announced his intent to return to college football, which was permitted by a ruling from a Louisiana judge allowing several players from the 2022 recruiting class to do so.
