= Kolbe Katsis =

American football player (born 2001)

No. 81 – Denver Broncos
- Positions: Wide receiver, kickoff returner
- Roster status: Practice squad

Personal information
- Born: December 28, 2001 (age 24); Owasso, Oklahoma, U.S.
- Listed height: 6 ft 1 in (1.85 m)
- Listed weight: 185 lb (84 kg)

Career information
- High school: Lincoln Christian (Tulsa, Oklahoma)
- College: Pittsburg State (2021–2023); Northern Arizona (2024–2025)
- NFL draft: 2026: undrafted

Career history
- Denver Broncos (2026–present)

Awards and highlights
- 2× First-team All-Big Sky (2025) (Note: Selected as both a wide receiver and kick returner); MIAA Freshman of the Year (2022); 2× Third-team All-MIAA (2023) (Note: Selected as both a wide receiver and return specialist)

Career NFL statistics as of Week 3, 2026
- Return yards: 146
- Stats at Pro Football Reference

Kolbe Katsis (born December 28, 2001) is an American professional football wide receiver and kickoff returner for the Denver Broncos of the National Football League (NFL). He played college football for the Pittsburg State Gorillas and Northern Arizona Lumberjacks. Katsis was signed by the Broncos as an undrafted free agent in 2026.

== Early life ==
Katsis was born on December 28, 2001, to Steve and Kelly Katsis. He attended and played football at Lincoln Christian School in Tulsa, Oklahoma during high school, catching a total of 50 passes for 1,235 receiving yards and 16 touchdowns as a wide receiver. This aided the team in achieving a 12–1 record and a state championship title in 2019.

== College career ==
=== Pittsburg State ===
During his redshirt freshman year at the Division II college Pittsburg State, Katsis had a breakout season, logging 22 receptions for 505 receiving yards and five touchdowns in 13 games while also averaging 32.8 yards on kick returns, as well as a 98-yard return touchdown. Due to this, Katsis was named the MIAA Freshman of the Year for 2022. The next year, Katsis built on his freshman performance, accruing 48 catches for 655 yards and four touchdowns and averaging 25.9 yards per return across 12 games played. He subsequently earned third-team All-MIAA honors as both a wide receiver and a return specialist.

=== Northern Arizona ===
Heading into his junior year, Katsis transferred to Northern Arizona, making the transition to Division I football. As a redshirt junior, he played in 11 games, producing 35 receptions for 498 receiving yards and two touchdowns, as well as two rushes for 14 rushing yards. In his final year at NAU, he recorded a career-high 60 catches for 1068 receiving yards and 10 touchdowns, 2 rushes for 64 rushing yards and one touchdown, and averaging a Big Sky Conference-leading 30.6 yards per kick return plus one 100-yard return touchdown. He was later named to the 2025 All-Big Sky first-team as both a wide receiver and kick returner.

== Professional career ==
Pre-draft measurables
Height	Weight	Arm length	Hand span	Wingspan	40-yard dash	10-yard split	20-yard split	20-yard shuttle	Three-cone drill	Vertical jump	Broad jump	Bench press
6 ft 0 1/4 in (1.84 m)	186 lb (84 kg)	31 3/8 in (0.80 m)	9 in (0.23 m)	6 ft 3 in (1.91 m)	4.43 s	1.52 s	2.52 s	4.17 s	6.90 s	36.5 in (0.93 m)	10 ft 8 in (3.25 m)	13 reps
All values from Pro Day

=== Denver Broncos ===
After going unselected in the 2026 NFL draft, Katsis was signed by the Denver Broncos as an undrafted free agent. Broncos special teams coordinator Darren Rizzi specifically targeted him for his return ability and experience, with incumbent return specialist Marvin Mims being a pending free agent in the next offseason.

On August 30, 2026, Katsis was waived by the Broncos as a part of final roster cuts. He was subsequently re-signed to the practice squad the following day. Katsis was elevated to the active roster for the Broncos' Week 3 matchup against the Los Angeles Rams. Katsis made his NFL debut that night. He recorded 107 kick return yards and 39 punt return yards for a total of 146, setting franchise record for return yards in a debut game.
