= Sean Fresch =

American football player (born 2001)

Sean Fresch Jr.
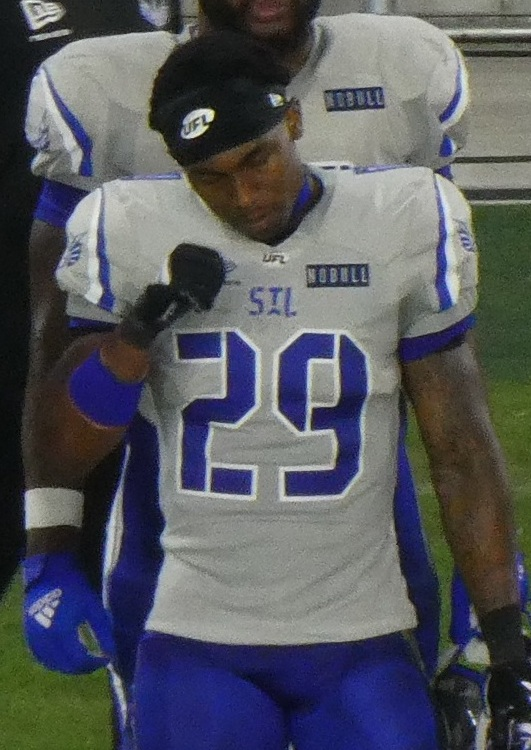
- Fresch with the St. Louis Battlehawks in 2026

No. 37 – Denver Broncos
- Positions: Cornerback, kickoff returner
- Roster status: Practice squad

Personal information
- Born: November 10, 2001 (age 25); Austin, Texas, U.S.
- Listed height: 5 ft 9 in (1.75 m)
- Listed weight: 181 lb (82 kg)

Career information
- High school: Lyndon B. Johnson (Austin, Texas)
- College: Rice (2020–2024)
- NFL draft: 2025: undrafted

Career history
- San Antonio Brahmas (2025); St. Louis Battlehawks (2026); Denver Broncos (2026–present)

Awards and highlights
- All-UFL Team (2026); First-team All-AAC (2024)

Career NFL statistics as of Week 5, 2026
- Tackles: 2
- Return yards: 67
- Stats at Pro Football Reference

Sean Quincy Fresch Jr. (born November 10, 2001) is an American professional football cornerback and kickoff returner for the Denver Broncos of the National Football League (NFL). He played college football for the Rice Owls. Fresch has also played for the San Antonio Brahmas and St. Louis Battlehawks of the United Football League (UFL).

== Early life ==
Fresch was born on November 10, 2001, to Sean and Paulette Fresch. In high school, he played football as a running back, cornerback, and return specialist in addition to competing in baseball and track. In his senior year, he was a unanimous all-district selection as a returner as well as a first-team selection as a running back, with 496 rushing yards, 343 receiving yards, 418 punt return yards, and 80 kick return yards as well as 12 total touchdowns. On defense, he logged 27 tackles, three tackles-for-loss, two interceptions, and two forced fumbles.

== College career ==
Fresch played college football at Rice from 2020 to 2024. He appeared in 47 games and recorded 152 tackles, 30 pass deflections, 3 interceptions, and returned both kicks and punts for a combined 847 yards. He earned First-team All-AAC honors in 2024.

== Professional career ==
Pre-draft measurables
Height	Weight
5 ft 7 5/8 in (1.72 m)	181 lb (82 kg)
Values from Pro Day

After going unselected in the 2025 NFL draft, Fresch tried out at the Kansas City Chiefs' rookie minicamp, but was not signed.

=== San Antonio Brahmas ===
After going undrafted in the 2025 NFL draft, Fresch signed with the San Antonio Brahmas of the United Football League (UFL).

=== St. Louis Battlehawks ===
After the Brahmas folded, Fresch was selected by the St. Louis Battlehawks of the United Football League (UFL) in the 2026 UFL draft on January 15, 2026. In 2026, Fresch led the league in punt return yards, and earned All-UFL honors.

=== Denver Broncos ===
After the 2026 UFL season, Fresch signed with the Denver Broncos of the National Football League (NFL) on June 15, 2026. He was released by the Broncos as a part of final roster cuts on August 30, but was re-signed to the practice squad the next day. Fresch played in his first career NFL game after he was elevated to the active roster for a Week 5 against the Los Angeles Chargers. He was subsequently elevated for the next two games as well. On November 7, he was promoted to the active roster. On November 10, he was waived and re-signed to the practice squad the next day.

== Personal life ==
Fresch has been friends with Denver Broncos cornerback Jahdae Barron since childhood, with them growing up in Austin together.
