= Johnny Walker Jr. =

American football player (born 2001)

No. 59 – Denver Broncos
- Position: Outside linebacker
- Roster status: Practice squad

Personal information
- Born: December 12, 2001 (age 24); Tampa, Florida, U.S.
- Listed height: 6 ft 3 in (1.91 m)
- Listed weight: 250 lb (113 kg)

Career information
- High school: George D. Chamberlain (Tampa)
- College: Missouri (2020–2024)
- NFL draft: 2025: undrafted

Career history
- Denver Broncos (2025–present)

Awards and highlights
- Second-team All-SEC (2024)
- Stats at Pro Football Reference

Johnny Walker Jr. (born December 12, 2001) is an American professional football outside linebacker for the Denver Broncos of the National Football League (NFL). He played college football for the Missouri Tigers and was signed by the Broncos as an undrafted free agent in 2025.

== Early life ==
Walker attended George D. Chamberlain High School in Tampa, Florida. He was rated as a three-star recruit and committed to play college football for the Missouri Tigers.

== College career ==
Walker took a redshirt season in 2020. In the 2023 season opener, he tallied six tackles with one and a half being for a loss, and a sack versus South Dakota. In the 2023 Cotton Bowl Classic, Walker notched two tackles, a sack, and a forced fumble, as he helped the Tigers defeat Ohio State, earning the game's defensive MVP award. During his first three collegiate seasons from 2021 to 2023, he appeared in 27 games where he totaled 59 tackles with 14 being for a loss, nine sacks, and three forced fumbles. In week 9 of the 2024 season, Walker totaled four tackles with two being for a loss, and two sacks against Alabama. For his performance during the 2024 season, he was named second-team all-SEC.

== Professional career ==
Pre-draft measurables
| Height | Weight | Arm length | Hand span | Wingspan | 40-yard dash | 10-yard split | 20-yard split | 20-yard shuttle | Three-cone drill | Vertical jump | Broad jump | Bench press |
|---|---|---|---|---|---|---|---|---|---|---|---|---|
| 6 ft 2 5/8 in (1.90 m) | 249 lb (113 kg) | 32 7/8 in (0.84 m) | 9 7/8 in (0.25 m) | 6 ft 7 1/2 in (2.02 m) | 4.79 s | 1.72 s | 2.69 s | 4.58 s | 7.69 s | 32.0 in (0.81 m) | 10 ft 0 in (3.05 m) | 21 reps |
All values from Pro Day

After going unselected in the 2025 NFL draft, Walker signed with the Denver Broncos as an undrafted free agent. On July 31, 2025, Walker was placed on season-ending injured reserve after suffering an injury during training camp.

On August 30, 2026, Walker was waived by the Broncos as a part of final roster cuts. He was re-signed to the team's practice squad the next day.
