= Nate Adkins =

American football player (born 1999)

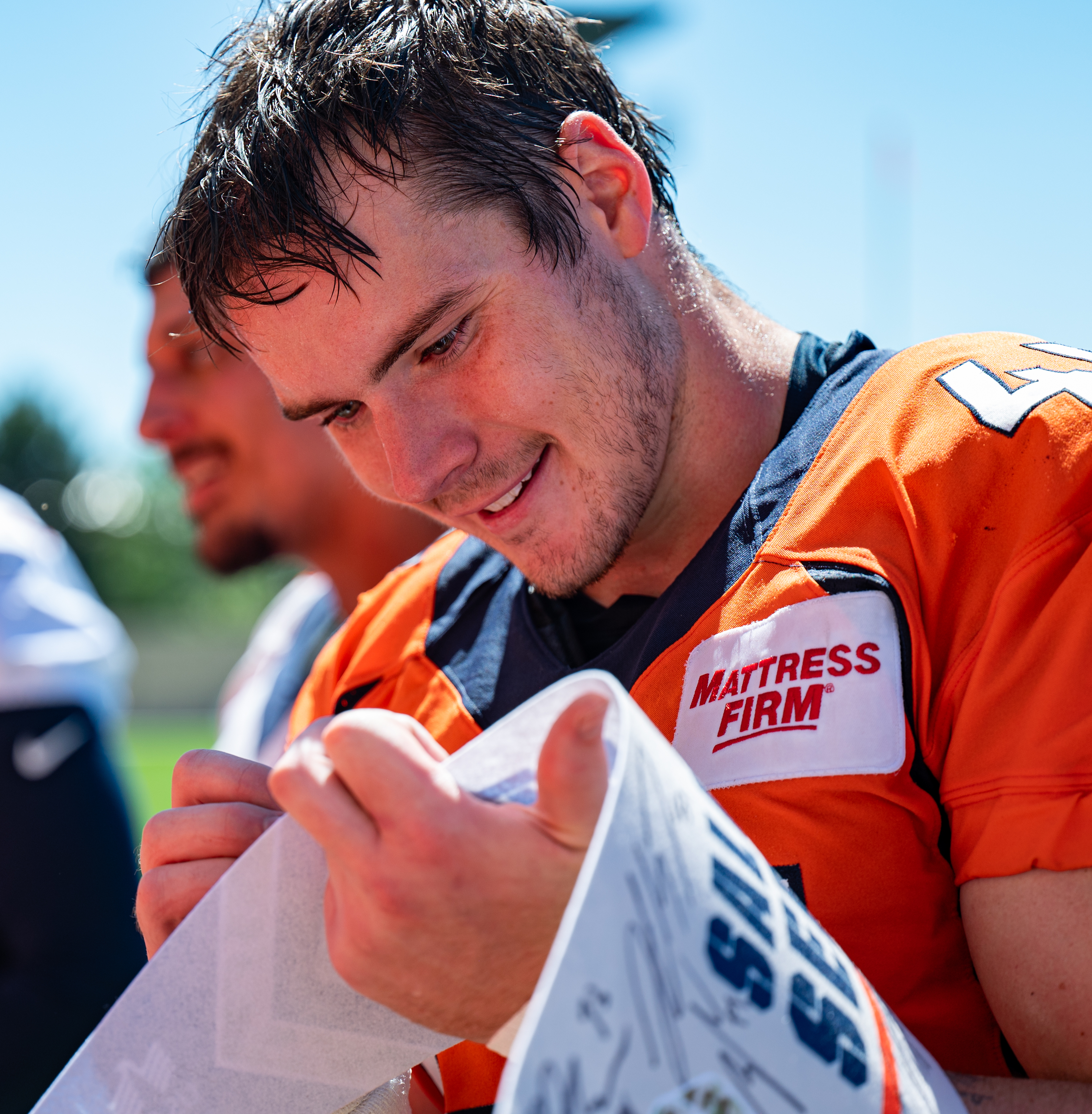
- Adkins with the Denver Broncos in 2023

No. 45 – Denver Broncos
- Position: Tight end
- Roster status: Active

Personal information
- Born: July 9, 1999 (age 27); Knoxville, Tennessee, U.S.
- Listed height: 6 ft 3 in (1.91 m)
- Listed weight: 252 lb (114 kg)

Career information
- High school: Bearden (Knoxville)
- College: East Tennessee State (2018–2021); South Carolina (2022)
- NFL draft: 2023: undrafted

Career history
- Denver Broncos (2023–present)

Awards and highlights
- 2× First-team All-SoCon (2019, 2020); Second-team All-SoCon (2021)

Career NFL statistics as of 2025
- Receptions: 24
- Receiving yards: 185
- Touchdowns: 4
- Stats at Pro Football Reference

Nate T. Adkins (born July 9, 1999) is an American professional football tight end for the Denver Broncos of the National Football League (NFL). He played college football for the East Tennessee State Buccaneers and South Carolina Gamecocks and was signed by the Broncos as an undrafted free agent in 2023.

== Early life ==
Adkins was born on July 9, 1999, the son of coach Greg Adkins. He attended Bearden High School in Knoxville, Tennessee, and played football and baseball. He played offensive tackle in football and totaled 76 tackles and six sacks as a senior while also having a career batting average of .354 while playing third baseman for the baseball team. He committed to play college football for the East Tennessee State Buccaneers.

== College career ==
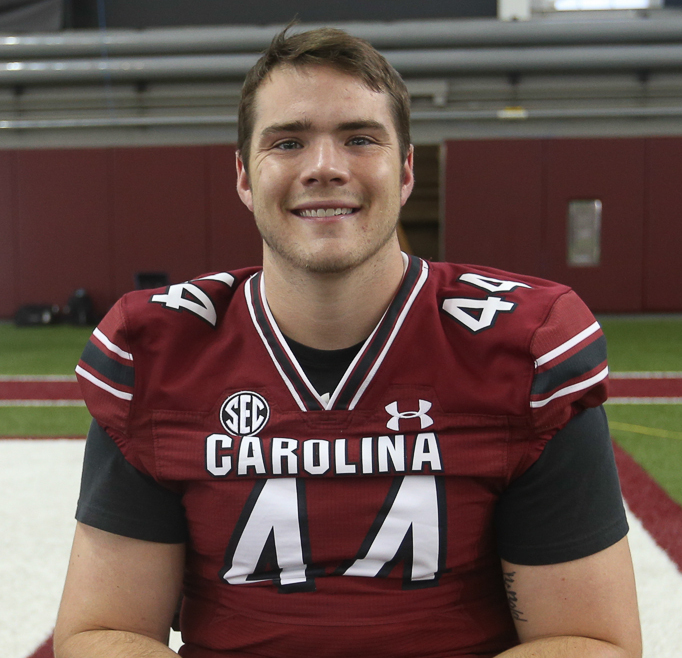
Adkins with the South Carolina Gamecocks in 2022

Adkins transitioned to playing tight end at East Tennessee State, despite having never played the position before. After being a backup as a true freshman in 2018, he earned a starting role in 2019 and was named first-team all-conference. He earned first-team all-conference honors again in the COVID-19-shortened 2020 season, catching 10 passes for 101 yards while starting four of six games. He caught 33 passes for 357 yards in 2021 and was named second-team all-conference. He opted to transfer after the season, finishing his stint at East Tennessee State University with 73 catches for 749 yards and four touchdowns. Adkins ended up transferring to play for the South Carolina Gamecocks. In his only season with them, he played all 13 games, nine as a starter, and had 13 receptions for 168 yards.

== Professional career ==
Pre-draft measurables
Height	Weight	Arm length	Hand span	Wingspan	40-yard dash	10-yard split	20-yard split	20-yard shuttle	Three-cone drill	Vertical jump	Broad jump	Bench press
6 ft 2 3/4 in (1.90 m)	252 lb (114 kg)	31 3/8 in (0.80 m)	9 in (0.23 m)	6 ft 4 1/4 in (1.94 m)	4.87 s	1.72 s	2.82 s	4.40 s	7.33 s	31.0 in (0.79 m)	10 ft 0 in (3.05 m)	14 reps
All values from Pro Day

After going unselected in the 2023 NFL draft, Adkins was signed by the Denver Broncos as an undrafted free agent. He made the team's final roster as a rookie.

Adkins scored his first professional touchdown in a 28–14 win against the Carolina Panthers on October 27, 2024.

On March 8, 2026, the Broncos signed Adkins to a one-year extension.
