= 2021 Denver Broncos season =

American football team season

- Owner: The Bowlen family (via Pat Bowlen’s estate)
- General manager: George Paton
- Head coach: Vic Fangio
- Home stadium: Empower Field at Mile High

Results
- Record: 7–10
- Division place: 4th AFC West
- Playoffs: Did not qualify
- All-Pros: S Justin Simmons (2nd team)

Uniform
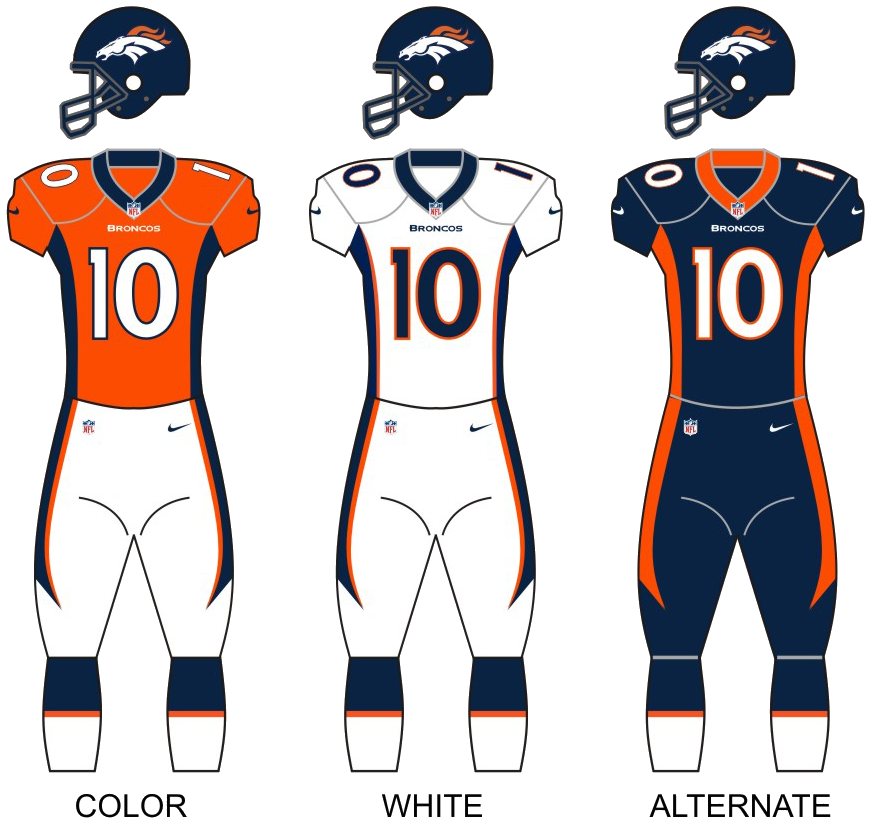

The 2021 season was the Denver Broncos' 52nd season in the National Football League (NFL) and the 62nd overall. It was also the final season under the ownership of Pat Bowlen's estate who owned the team since the 1984 season.

2021 marked the first season since 2011 in which John Elway did not serve as general manager, as he relinquished those duties shortly after the end of the 2020 season. Elway remained part of the Broncos' personnel, as the president of football operations, and led the hiring of new general manager George Paton.

The Broncos started 3–0, albeit against teams who would combine for a 11–40 record (New York Giants, Jacksonville Jaguars and New York Jets), but after that, the Broncos' performance was memorably bad, going 4–10 the rest of the way, including losing their last four games. The Broncos' slightly improved on their 5–11 record from 2020, but missed the playoffs for a sixth consecutive season and suffered their fifth consecutive losing season (both the second-longest streaks in franchise history) following a loss to the Los Angeles Chargers in Week 17. Linebacker Von Miller, the Broncos' franchise record-holder for the most career sacks, was traded to the Los Angeles Rams at mid-season.

Statistically, the Broncos' ranked third in scoring defense, and their defense also ranked within the top 10 in total yards and passing yards. However, their offense ranked in the bottom 10 in points scored, scoring 30+ points only twice and failing to reach 20 points in 9 of their 17 games, resulting in the firing of head coach Vic Fangio after three seasons.

== Coaching changes ==
- February 4: Chris Cook was hired as an offensive quality control coach.
- February 8: Christian Parker was hired as a defensive backs coach. He spent the previous two seasons with the Green Bay Packers as a defensive quality control coach. Parker replaces Renaldo Hill, who departed on January 25 to become the Los Angeles Chargers' defensive coordinator.

== Front office changes ==
- January 3: During halftime of the Broncos' 2020 regular season finale, director of player personnel Matt Russell announced his retirement, after eight seasons in that role.
- January 4: John Elway announced that he will remain president of football operations, but will relinquish his general manager duties, and led the hiring of a new general manager.
- January 13: George Paton was hired as the new Broncos' general manager. Paton spent the previous 14 seasons in the Minnesota Vikings' front office, including the previous nine seasons as the Vikings' assistant general manager and the last three as vice president of player personnel.
- May 21: Darren Mougey was promoted to be Paton's right-hand man, director of player personnel.

== Roster changes ==
=== Future contracts ===
All players listed below were signed to reserve/future contracts on January 4, unless noted otherwise. The signings include all ten players who were on the practice squad of the final roster at the end of the 2020 season. Each player was officially added to the active roster on March 17—the first day of the 2021 league year.

| Position | Player | Notes |
|---|---|---|
| OT | Quinn Bailey | waived August 31, assigned to the practice squad on September 1, promoted to the active roster on January 7 |
| WR | Trinity Benson | traded to the Detroit Lions on August 31 |
| WR | Fred Brown | waived February 2 |
| S | Chris Cooper | waived June 7 |
| RB | Jeremy Cox | waived May 3 |
| RB | Damarea Crockett | waived August 31, assigned to the practice squad on September 1, promoted to the active roster on September 22, waived October 26, assigned to the practice squad on October 27, promoted to the active roster on December 4, waived December 21, assigned to the practice squad on December 23 |
| WR | Kendall Hinton | waived August 31, assigned to the practice squad on September 1, promoted to the active roster on September 14 |
| TE | Jordan Leggett | waived February 2 |
| C | Patrick Morris | signed January 5, waived July 27 |
| OT | Darrin Paulo | waived February 2 |
| DT | Deyon Sizer | designated as waived/injured on August 17, assigned to the practice squad on December 28, released from the practice squad on January 3 |

=== Free agents ===
==== Unrestricted ====
| Position | Player | 2021 team | Notes |
|---|---|---|---|
| LB | Jeremiah Attaochu | Chicago Bears | signed with the Bears on March 21 |
| CB | De'Vante Bausby | Las Vegas Raiders | signed with the Raiders on June 17 |
| TE | Jake Butt | Chicago Bears | signed with the Bears on June 18 |
| LB | Austin Calitro | Chicago Bears | originally an RFA, signed with the Bears on May 17 |
| LB | Anthony Chickillo | None | retired on July 11 |
| OT | Demar Dotson | None | |
| DT | Shelby Harris | Denver Broncos | re-signed March 15 |
| S | Kareem Jackson | Denver Broncos | contract option for 2021 declined on March 15, re-signed March 24 |
| LB | Joseph Jones | Tampa Bay Buccaneers | signed with the Buccaneers on May 5 |
| RB | Phillip Lindsay | Houston Texans | originally an RFA, assigned right-of-first-refusal tender on March 16, tender rescinded on March 18, signed with the Texans on March 19 |
| LB | Von Miller | Denver Broncos | contract option for 2021 picked up on March 16 |
| S | Will Parks | Kansas City Chiefs | signed with the Chiefs on May 6 |
| S | Justin Simmons | Denver Broncos | assigned franchise tag on March 5, re-signed March 19 |
| CB | Kevin Toliver | None | originally an RFA |
| DE | DeMarcus Walker | Houston Texans | signed with the Texans on April 16 |
| G | Elijah Wilkinson | Chicago Bears | signed with the Bears on March 23 |
| DT | Sylvester Williams | None | |

Note: Unrestricted free agents who were originally Restricted free agents (RFA) had three accrued seasons whose contracts expired at the end of the previous season, and did not receive a qualifying offer before the start of the 2021 league year on March 17.

==== Restricted and exclusive-rights ====
| Position | Player | Tag | 2021 team | Notes |
|---|---|---|---|---|
| OT | Calvin Anderson | ERFA | Denver Broncos | assigned tender on March 16, re-signed May 17 |
| LB | A. J. Johnson | RFA | Denver Broncos | assigned tender on March 16, re-signed May 20 |
| S | Trey Marshall | RFA | Denver Broncos | assigned tender on March 16, re-signed May 18, waived August 31 |
| WR | Tim Patrick | RFA | Denver Broncos | assigned tender on March 16, re-signed May 18 |
| WR | Diontae Spencer | ERFA | Denver Broncos | assigned tender on March 16, re-signed April 16 |
Restricted Free Agent (RFA): Players with three accrued seasons whose contracts expired at the end of the previous season Exclusive-Rights Free Agent (ERFA): Players with two or fewer accrued seasons whose contracts expired at the end of the previous season

=== Signings ===
| Position | Player | 2020 team(s) | Notes |
|---|---|---|---|
| RB | Mike Boone | Minnesota Vikings | signed March 18, placed on injured reserve on September 1, activated October 16 |
| OT | Cody Conway | None | signed May 17, designated as waived/injured on August 4 |
| QB | Case Cookus | New York Giants | signed May 17, waived May 20 |
| WR | Amara Darboh | None | signed June 17, released August 6 |
| CB | Ronald Darby | Washington Football Team | signed March 17, placed on injured reserve on January 7 |
| CB | Rojesterman Farris | None | signed August 2, waived August 17, assigned to the practice squad on September 14 released from the practice squad on October 5, re-signed to the practice squad on October 13, released from the practice squad on November 2 |
| OT | Cameron Fleming | New York Giants | signed May 20, released August 31, re-signed September 1 |
| CB | Mike Ford | Detroit Lions | claimed off waivers from the Lions on September 1, placed on injured reserve on October 16, activated November 6 |
| CB | Kyle Fuller | Chicago Bears | signed March 20 |
| NT | Justin Hamilton | Dallas Cowboys | signed December 28 |
| C | Brett Jones | Minnesota Vikings | signed July 27, placed on injured reserve August 23 |
| LB | Peter Kalambayi | Houston Texans | signed June 7, waived August 17 |
| RB | Adrian Killins | Philadelphia Eagles | signed August 17, designated as waived/injured on August 23 |
| LB | Micah Kiser | Los Angeles Rams | signed September 22 |
| RB | Nate McCrary | Baltimore Ravens | claimed off waivers from the Ravens on September 1, waived September 23 |
| DT | Isaiah Mack | New England Patriots; Tennessee Titans | signed February 11, waived August 31 |
| OT | Bobby Massie | Chicago Bears | signed May 12 |
| WR | David Moore | None | signed September 28, released October 19, assigned to the practice squad on October 20, released from the practice squad on November 9 |
| LB | Aaron Patrick | Jacksonville Jaguars | signed September 23 |
| LB | Natrez Patrick | Los Angeles Rams | claimed off waivers from the Rams on January 10, waived June 17 |
| WR | De'Mornay Pierson-El | None | signed June 17, waived August 31 |
| TE | Eric Saubert | Jacksonville Jaguars | signed May 4 |
| CB | Saivion Smith | Dallas Cowboys | signed August 4, waived August 31, assigned to the practice squad on September 7, released from the practice squad on October 26 |
| DE | Shamar Stephen | Minnesota Vikings | signed April 6, released August 31, re-signed September 1 |
| LB | Pita Taumoepenu | Atlanta Falcons | signed May 17, released August 23, assigned to the practice squad on October 19 |
| S | Tedric Thompson | Cleveland Browns | signed July 27, waived August 8 |
| WR | Damion Willis | None | signed May 18, waived July 20 |

=== Departures ===
| Position | Player | Notes |
|---|---|---|
| CB | Essang Bassey | waived December 18 |
| RB | LeVante Bellamy | designated as waived/injured on August 17 |
| CB | A. J. Bouye | released February 10 |
| DE | Jurrell Casey | released February 25 |
| WR | Tyrie Cleveland | waived August 31, assigned to the practice squad on September 1, promoted to the active roster on October 20, waived December 4, promoted to the active roster on January 7 |
| CB | Duke Dawson | waived November 9, assigned to the practice squad on November 10 |
| QB | Jeff Driskel | released May 4 |
| TE | Austin Fort | waived August 31 |
| RB | Royce Freeman | waived September 1 |
| CB | Nate Hairston | released August 31, assigned to the practice squad on September 1 |
| WR | DaeSean Hamilton | waived with a non-football injury designation on May 18 |
| DE | Jonathan Harris | waived September 1, promoted to the active roster on January 3 |
| DE | Joel Heath | waived February 2 |
| S | Alijah Holder | waived February 2 |
| OT | Ja'Wuan James | released May 14, eleven days after an Achilles tendon rupture |
| CB | Parnall Motley | waived August 31 |
| QB | Brett Rypien | waived August 31, assigned to the practice squad on September 1, promoted to the active roster on September 28 |
| C | Austin Schlottmann | waived August 31, assigned to the practice squad on September 1, promoted to the active roster on November 9 |
| LB | Derrek Tuszka | waived August 31 |
| TE | Nick Vannett | released March 23 |
| LB | Josh Watson | waived August 24 |

=== Draft ===
2021 Denver Broncos Draft
| Round | Selection | Player | Position | College | Notes |
|---|---|---|---|---|---|
| 1 | 9 | Patrick Surtain II | CB | Alabama | signed May 18, placed on injured reserve on January 7 |
| 2 | 35 | Javonte Williams | RB | North Carolina | signed July 24 |
| 3 | 98 | Quinn Meinerz | C | Wisconsin–Whitewater | signed July 24 |
| 3 | 105 | Baron Browning | LB | Ohio State | signed July 23 |
| 4 | None—see table below | | | | |
| 5 | 152 | Caden Sterns | S | Texas | signed May 13 |
| 5 | 164 | Jamar Johnson | S | Indiana | signed May 13 |
| 6 | 219 | Seth Williams | WR | Auburn | signed May 13, waived August 31, assigned to the practice squad on September 1, promoted to the active roster on January 3 |
| 7 | 237 | Kary Vincent Jr. | CB | LSU | signed May 13, traded to the Philadelphia Eagles on November 2 |
| 7 | 239 | Jonathon Cooper | LB | Ohio State | signed June 15 |
| 7 | 253 | Marquiss Spencer | DE | Mississippi State | signed May 13, waived August 31, assigned to the practice squad on September 1 |

==== Draft trades ====
| Trade partner | Broncos give | Broncos receive | Source |
|---|---|---|---|
| Atlanta Falcons | original 2021 second-round selection—No. 40; 2021 fourth-round selection—No. 114 | 2021 second-round selection—No. 35; 2021 sixth-round selection—No. 219 | |
| Carolina Panthers | original 2021 sixth-round selection—No. 191 | QB Teddy Bridgewater | |
| Cleveland Browns | FB Andy Janovich | 2021 seventh-round selection—No. 253 | |
| New Orleans Saints | 2021 third-round selection (No. 76–from NYG) | two 2021 third-round selections—Nos. 98 & 105 | |
| New York Giants | original 2021 third-round selection—No. 71 | 2021 third-round selection (No. 76—later traded to NO); 2021 fifth-round selection—No. 164 | |
| New York Giants | CB Isaac Yiadom | 2021 seventh-round selection—No. 239 | |

=== Undrafted free agents ===
All undrafted free agents were signed on May 2—one day after the 2021 NFL draft concluded, unless noted otherwise.

2021 Denver Broncos undrafted free agents
| Player | Position | College | Notes |
|---|---|---|---|
| Shaun Beyer | TE | Iowa | waived August 31, assigned to the practice squad on September 1 |
| David Curry | LB | Georgia Tech | waived May 17 |
| Max Duffy | P | Kentucky | waived June 17 |
| DeVontres Dukes | WR | South Florida | designated as waived/injured on August 17 |
| Drew Himmelman | OT | Illinois State | waived August 31, assigned to the practice squad on September 1 |
| Warren Jackson | WR | Colorado State | waived August 7 |
| Nolan Laufenberg | G | Air Force | waived August 23 |
| Mac McCain | CB | North Carolina A&T | waived August 31, assigned to the practice squad on September 1, claimed off waivers from the Philadelphia Eagles on November 10 waived November 23 |
| Branden Mack | WR | Temple | waived August 24 |
| Andre Mintze | LB | Vanderbilt | the only undrafted rookie to make the Week 1 roster, placed on injured reserve on October 19 |
| Lorenzo Neal Jr. | DT | Purdue | originally signed by the New Orleans Saints, signed by the Broncos on August 8, waived August 17 |
| Adam Prentice | FB | South Carolina | waived August 31 |
| Curtis Robinson | LB | Stanford | waived August 31, assigned to the practice squad on September 1, promoted to the active roster on October 19, waived October 26, assigned to the practice squad on October 27, released from the practice squad on November 30 |
| Stevie Scott III | RB | Indiana | originally signed by the New Orleans Saints, signed by the Broncos on August 23, waived August 31 |
| Barrington Wade | LB | Iowa | claimed off waivers from the Baltimore Ravens on August 7, waived August 31, assigned to the practice squad on September 1, promoted to the active roster on October 19 assigned to the practice squad on October 27 |

=== Post-draft trades ===
| Trade partner | Broncos give | Broncos receive | Source |
|---|---|---|---|
| Detroit Lions | WR Trinity Benson; 2023 sixth-round selection | 2022 fifth- and seventh-round selections | |
| Los Angeles Rams | 2024 sixth-round selection | LB Kenny Young; 2024 seventh-round selection | |
| Los Angeles Rams | LB Von Miller | 2022 second- and third-round selections | |
| Minnesota Vikings | 2022 seventh-round selection | LB Stephen Weatherly; 2023 seventh-round selection | |
| Philadelphia Eagles | CB Kary Vincent Jr. | 2022 sixth-round selection | |
| San Francisco 49ers | 2022 sixth-round selection 2023 seventh-round selection | LB Jonas Griffith; 2022 seventh-round selection | |

=== Injuries ===
| Position | Player | Time & type of injury | Games missed | Source(s) |
|---|---|---|---|---|
| OT | Calvin Anderson | knee, Week 12 | season-ending injured reserve, starting with Week 13 | |
| CB | Essang Bassey | knee, Week 13 of the 2020 season | physically unable to perform list, Weeks 1–9 | |
| TE | Andrew Beck | elbow, Week 15 | season-ending injured reserve, starting with Week 16 | |
| RB | Mike Boone | quad, preseason | injured reserve, Weeks 1–5 | |
| QB | Teddy Bridgewater | concussion, Week 15 | Week 16, season-ending injured reserve, starting with Week 17 | |
| CB | Bryce Callahan | knee, Week 8 | injured reserve, Weeks 9–13 | |
| LB | Bradley Chubb | ankle, preseason | Week 1 | |
| LB | Bradley Chubb | bone spur in ankle, Week 2 | injured reserve, Weeks 3–11 | |
| CB | Ronald Darby | hamstring, Week 1 | injured reserve, Weeks 2–4 | |
| CB | Ronald Darby | shoulder, Week 17 | season-ending injured reserve, Week 18 | |
| CB | Duke Dawson | knee, Week 14 of the 2020 season | physically unable to perform list, Weeks 1–8 | |
| CB | Mike Ford | knee, Week 5 | injured reserve, Weeks 6–8 | |
| G | Graham Glasgow | ankle, Week 10 | season-ending injured reserve, starting with Week 9 | |
| LB | Jonas Griffith | hamstring, Week 3 | injured reserve, Weeks 5–7 | |
| WR | K. J. Hamler | torn ACL, Week 3 | season-ending injured reserve, starting with Week 4 | |
| S | Kareem Jackson | back, Week 17 | season-ending injured reserve, Week 18 | |
| WR | Jerry Jeudy | high ankle sprain, Week 1 | injured reserve, Weeks 2–7 | |
| LB | Josey Jewell | torn pectoral muscle, Week 2 | season-ending injured reserve, starting with Week 3 | |
| LB | A. J. Johnson | torn pectoral muscle, Week 6 | season-ending injured reserve, starting with Week 7 | |
| C | Brett Jones | ruptured biceps, preseason | injured reserve, missed the entire 2021 season | |
| LB | Micah Kiser | groin, Week 7 | injured reserve, Weeks 8–13 | |
| LB | Von Miller | ankle, Week 7 | Week 8 | |
| LB | Andre Mintze | hamstring, Week 6 | season-ending injured reserve, starting with Week 7 | |
| CB | Michael Ojemudia | hamstring, preseason | injured reserve, Weeks 1–13 | |
| TE | Albert Okwuegbunam | hamstring, October 6 practice | injured reserve, Weeks 5–7 | |
| G | Dalton Risner | elbow, Week 17 | season-ending injured reserve, Week 18 | |
| CB | Patrick Surtain II | calf, Week 17 | season-ending injured reserve, Week 18 | |
| NT | DeShawn Williams | elbow, Week 16 | season-ending injured reserve, starting with Week 17 | |

=== Von Miller trade ===
On November 1, linebacker Von Miller was traded to the Los Angeles Rams in exchange for the Rams' second- and third-round selections in the 2022 NFL draft. Miller left the team as the franchise record-holder for the most career sacks in Denver Broncos' history. He was selected to the Pro Bowl eight times and received the first-team All-Pro honor three times. He also received MVP honors in Super Bowl 50, when the Broncos defeated the Carolina Panthers in 2015.

=== Practice squad elevations ===
Each NFL team is permitted to elevate up to two players from the practice squad to the active game day roster per week, with those designated players being allowed to return to the practice squad up to two times without being exposed to waivers. If a practice squad player is elevated to the game day roster for a third time, that player will be required to clear waivers before returning to the practice squad. Teams are also permitted to protect a maximum of four practice squad players to prevent opposing teams from signing those players to their active rosters.

| Week | Player(s) promoted | Source |
|---|---|---|
| 1 | RB Damarea Crockett, CB Nate Hairston | |
| 2 | RB Damarea Crockett, G Austin Schlottmannn | |
| 4 | LB Curtis Robinson, G Austin Schlottmannn | |
| 5 | WR Tyrie Cleveland | |
| 6 | WRs John Brown and Tyrie Cleveland | |
| 7 | WR John Brown, LB Pita Taumoepenu | |
| 8 | LB Barrington Wade | |
| 9 | DE Jonathan Harris, G Austin Schlottmannn, LB Barrington Wade | |
| 10 | OT Quinn Bailey, RB Damarea Crockett, OT Drew Himmelman and LB Curtis Robinson | |
| 12 | OT Quinn Bailey | |
| 16 | OT Quinn Bailey | |
| 17 | OT Quinn Bailey, OT Drew Himmelman, S Ha Ha Clinton-Dix, DE Marquiss Spencer; DE Jonathan Harris, LB Barrington Wade, WR Rico Gafford, CB Rojesterman Farris | |
| 18 | S Ha Ha Clinton-Dix | |

Note: Damarea Crockett and Curtis Robinson were elevated in Week 10 as COVID-19 replacements.

=== COVID-19 designations ===
- July 26: Safety Jamar Johnson and cornerback Kary Vincent Jr., the team's fifth- and seventh-round draft selections, respectively, were placed on the Reserve/COVID-19 list. Vincent was activated on July 31, while Johnson was activated on August 6.
- October 26: Guard Netane Muti was placed on the Reserve/COVID-19 list. He was activated on November 9 with a roster exemption.
- November 2: Tight end Noah Fant was placed on the Reserve/COVID-19 list. He was activated on November 10.
- November 8: Backup quarterback Drew Lock was placed on the Reserve/COVID-19 list. He was activated on November 20.
- November 9: Cornerback Michael Ojemudia, who was on injured reserve at the time, as well as linebacker Justin Strnad, were placed on the Reserve/COVID-19 list. They were both activated on November 20.
- November 12: Guard Austin Schlottmann was placed on the Reserve/COVID-19 list. He was activated on November 24.
- Offensive coordinator Pat Shurmur missed the Broncos' Week 10 loss to the Philadelphia Eagles due to a positive COVID-19 test.
- November 22: Offensive tackle Garett Bolles was placed on the Reserve/COVID-19 list. He was activated on December 2.
- December 10: Running back Mike Boone and safety P. J. Locke were placed on the Reserve/COVID-19 list. Lock was activated on December 18, while Boone was activated on December 21.
- December 11: Linebacker Malik Reed was placed on the Reserve/COVID-19 list. He was activated on December 22.
- December 23: Center Lloyd Cushenberry was placed on the Reserve/COVID-19 list. He was activated on December 29
- December 27–30: In the week leading up to the Broncos' Week 16 game at the Los Angeles Chargers, numerous players were placed on the Reserve/COVID-19 list: defensive end McTelvin Agim, cornerbacks Bryce Callahan and Mike Ford, linebackers Baron Browning Bradley Chubb, Jonathon Cooper, Andre Mintze and Stephen Weatherly, nose tackle Mike Purcell, offensive tackles Calvin Anderson and Bobby Massie, wide receivers Jerry Jeudy and Tim Patrick, and safety Caden Sterns. Mintze was later activated on January 1, while the rest were activated on January 5.
- January 3: Placekicker Brandon McManus and punter Sam Martin were placed on the Reserve/COVID-19 list. Both were activated four days later (January 7).

== Personnel ==
=== Staff / Coaches ===
2021 Denver Broncos staff
| Front office: President/CEO/EXECUTOR OF WILL – Joe Ellis; President of football operations – John Elway; General manager – George Paton; Director of player personnel – Darren Mougey; Director of pro personnel – A. J. Durso; VP of football administration – Rich Hurtado; VP of Football Operation and Compliance – Mark Thewes; VP of player development – Ray Jackson; Director of college scouting – Brian Stark; Senior Analyst – Matt Sheldon; Head coaches: Head coach – Vic Fangio; Offensive coaches: Offensive coordinator – Pat Shurmur; Quarterbacks – Mike Shula; Running backs – Curtis Modkins; Wide receivers – Zach Azzanni; Tight ends – Wade Harman; Offensive line – Mike Munchak; Assistant offensive line – Chris Kuper; Offensive quality control – Chris Cook; Offensive quality control – Justin Rascati | Defensive coaches: Defensive coordinator – Ed Donatell; Defensive line – Bill Kollar; Assistant defensive line/assistant to head coach – Mike Hiestand; Linebackers – Reggie Herring; Outside linebackers – John Pagano; Defensive backs – Christian Parker; Defensive pass game specialist – Chris Beake; Defensive quality control – Nathaniel Willingham; Special teams coaches: Special teams coordinator – Tom McMahon; Assistant special teams – Chris Gould; Strength and conditioning: Head strength and conditioning – Loren Landow; Assistant strength and conditioning – Korey Jones; Assistant strength and conditioning – Mark Loecher; Assistant strength and conditioning – Pierre Ngo; Player performance assistant – Emily Zaler |

=== Final roster ===
2021 Denver Broncos roster
| Quarterbacks (QB): 3 Drew Lock; 4 Brett Rypien; Running backs (RB): 26 Mike Boone; 25 Melvin Gordon; 33 Javonte Williams; Wide receivers (WR): 16 Tyrie Cleveland; 9 Kendall Hinton; 10 Jerry Jeudy; 81 Tim Patrick; 11 Diontae Spencer; 14 Courtland Sutton; 19 Seth Williams; Tight ends (TE): 87 Noah Fant; 85 Albert Okwuegbunam; 82 Eric Saubert | Offensive linemen (OL): 75 Quinn Bailey T; 72 Garett Bolles T; 79 Lloyd Cushenberry C; 73 Cameron Fleming T; 70 Bobby Massie T; 77 Quinn Meinerz G; 52 Netane Muti G; 71 Austin Schlottmann C/G; Defensive linemen (DL): 95 McTelvin Agim DE; 74 Justin Hamilton NT; 92 Jonathan Harris DE; 96 Shelby Harris DE; 93 Dre'Mont Jones DE; 98 Mike Purcell NT; 99 Shamar Stephen DE | Linebackers (LB): 56 Baron Browning ILB; 55 Bradley Chubb OLB; 53 Jonathon Cooper OLB; 50 Jonas Griffith ILB; 43 Micah Kiser ILB; 48 Andre Mintze OLB; 94 Aaron Patrick OLB; 59 Malik Reed OLB; 40 Justin Strnad ILB; 91 Stephen Weatherly OLB; 41 Kenny Young ILB; Defensive backs (DB): 29 Bryce Callahan CB; 12 Mike Ford CB; 23 Kyle Fuller CB; 49 Jamar Johnson FS; 37 P. J. Locke SS; 13 Michael Ojemudia CB; 31 Justin Simmons FS; 30 Caden Sterns SS; Special teams (ST): 46 Jacob Bobenmoyer LS; 6 Sam Martin P; 8 Brandon McManus K | Practice squad: 88 Shaun Beyer TE; 32 Ha Ha Clinton-Dix FS; 28 Damarea Crockett RB; 20 Duke Dawson CB (PS/I); 39 Rojesterman Farris CB; 17 Travis Fulgham WR; 80 Rico Gafford WR; 15 Anthony Gordon QB; 78 Drew Himmelman T; 69 Tristen Hoge G; 68 Zack Johnson G; 97 Akeem Spence DE; 51 Marquiss Spencer DE (COVID-19); 54 Barrington Wade ILB; 86 Caleb Wilson TE; Reserve: 76 Calvin Anderson T (IR); 83 Andrew Beck TE (IR); 5 Teddy Bridgewater QB (IR); 60 Cody Conway T (IR); 21 Ronald Darby CB (IR); 61 Graham Glasgow G (IR); 27 Nate Hairston CB (COVID-19); 17 DaeSean Hamilton WR (NF-Inj.); 1 K. J. Hamler WR (IR); 22 Kareem Jackson SS (IR); 47 Josey Jewell ILB (IR); 45 A. J. Johnson ILB (IR); 65 Brett Jones C (IR); 17 Adrian Killins RB (IR); 57 Natrez Patrick OLB (IR); 66 Dalton Risner G (IR); 2 Patrick Surtain II CB (IR); 90 DeShawn Williams NT (IR); Rookies in italics 52 active, 18 reserve, 13 practice squad (2 exempt) |

== Preseason ==
The Broncos' preseason schedule was announced on May 12.

| Week | Date | Opponent | Result | Record | Venue | Recap |
|---|---|---|---|---|---|---|
| 1 | August 14 | at Minnesota Vikings | W 33–6 | 1–0 | U.S. Bank Stadium | Recap |
| 2 | August 21 | at Seattle Seahawks | W 30–3 | 2–0 | Lumen Field | Recap |
| 3 | August 28 | Los Angeles Rams | W 17–12 | 3–0 | Empower Field at Mile High | Recap |

== Regular season ==
=== Schedule ===
The Broncos' 2021 schedule was announced on May 12. Until the Week 18 flex, the Broncos would not have appeared on Monday Night Football for the first time since 1991.

| Week | Date | Opponent | Result | Record | Venue | Recap |
|---|---|---|---|---|---|---|
| 1 | September 12 | at New York Giants | **W** 27–13 | 1–0 | MetLife Stadium | Recap |
| 2 | September 19 | at Jacksonville Jaguars | **W** 23–13 | 2–0 | TIAA Bank Field | Recap |
| 3 | September 26 | New York Jets | **W** 26–0 | 3–0 | Empower Field at Mile High | Recap |
| 4 | October 3 | Baltimore Ravens | **L** 7–23 | 3–1 | Empower Field at Mile High | Recap |
| 5 | October 10 | at Pittsburgh Steelers | **L** 19–27 | 3–2 | Heinz Field | Recap |
| 6 | October 17 | **Las Vegas Raiders** | **L** 24–34 | 3–3 | Empower Field at Mile High | Recap |
| 7 | October 21 | at Cleveland Browns | **L** 14–17 | 3–4 | FirstEnergy Stadium | Recap |
| 8 | October 31 | Washington Football Team | **W** 17–10 | 4–4 | Empower Field at Mile High | Recap |
| 9 | November 7 | at Dallas Cowboys | **W** 30–16 | 5–4 | AT&T Stadium | Recap |
| 10 | November 14 | Philadelphia Eagles | **L** 13–30 | 5–5 | Empower Field at Mile High | Recap |
| 11 | Bye | | | | | |
| 12 | November 28 | **Los Angeles Chargers** | **W** 28–13 | 6–5 | Empower Field at Mile High | Recap |
| 13 | December 5 | at **Kansas City Chiefs** | **L** 9–22 | 6–6 | Arrowhead Stadium | Recap |
| 14 | December 12 | Detroit Lions | **W** 38–10 | 7–6 | Empower Field at Mile High | Recap |
| 15 | December 19 | Cincinnati Bengals | **L** 10–15 | 7–7 | Empower Field at Mile High | Recap |
| 16 | December 26 | at **Las Vegas Raiders** | **L** 13–17 | 7–8 | Allegiant Stadium | Recap |
| 17 | January 2 | at **Los Angeles Chargers** | **L** 13–34 | 7–9 | SoFi Stadium | Recap |
| 18 | January 8 | **Kansas City Chiefs** | **L** 24–28 | 7–10 | Empower Field at Mile High | Recap |

Note: Intra-division opponents are in bold text.

=== Game summaries ===
==== Week 1: at New York Giants ====
Week 1: Denver Broncos at New York Giants – Game summary

| Quarter | 1 | 2 | 3 | 4 | Total |
|---|---|---|---|---|---|
| **Broncos** | 0 | 10 | 7 | 10 | **27** |
| Giants | 0 | 7 | 0 | 6 | **13** |

at MetLife Stadium, East Rutherford, New Jersey

- Date: September 12
- Game time: 4:25 p.m. EDT/2:25 p.m. MDT
- Game weather: Fair, 82 °F (28 °C)
- Game attendance: 74,119
- Referee: Ronald Torbert
- TV announcers (Fox): Adam Amin, Mark Schlereth and Shannon Spake
- Recap, Game Book

Game information

**First quarter**

- No scoring plays

**Second quarter**

- DEN – Brandon McManus 23-yard field goal, 13:21. Broncos 3–0. **Drive: 15 plays, 62 yards, 8:42.**
- NYG – Sterling Shepard 38-yard pass from Daniel Jones (Graham Gano kick), 9:07. Giants 7–3. **Drive: 7 plays, 75 yards, 4:22.**
- DEN – Tim Patrick 2-yard pass from Teddy Bridgewater (Brandon McManus kick), 0:13. Broncos 10-7. **Drive: 7 plays, 57 yards, 2:17.**

**Third quarter**

- DEN – Albert Okwuegbunam 4-yard pass from Teddy Bridgewater (Brandon McManus kick), 6:58. Broncos 17–7. **Drive: 16 plays, 75 yards, 8:12.**

**Fourth quarter**

- DEN – Brandon McManus 36-yard field goal, 12:49. Broncos 20–7. **Drive: 10 plays, 69 yards, 5:03.**
- DEN – Melvin Gordon 70-yard run (Brandon McManus kick), 4:48. Broncos 27–7. **Drive: 4 plays, 94 yards, 1:48.**
- NYG – Daniel Jones 4-yard run, 0:01. Broncos 27–13. **Drive: 8 plays, 64 yards, 1:49.**

**Top passers**

- DEN – Teddy Bridgewater – 28/36, 264 yards, 2 TD
- NYG – Daniel Jones – 22/37, 267 yards, TD

**Top rushers**

- DEN – Melvin Gordon – 11 rushes, 101 yards, TD
- NYG – Daniel Jones – 6 rushes, 27 yards, TD

**Top receivers**

- DEN – Jerry Jeudy – 6 receptions, 72 yards
- NYG – Sterling Shepard – 7 receptions, 113 yards, TD

After a scoreless first quarter, a 23-yard field goal by placekicker Brandon McManus gave the Broncos the early lead. The drive was extended after Teddy Bridgewater, the Broncos' fifth different Week 1 starting quarterback in as many seasons, completed a 15-yard pass to wide receiver Tim Patrick on a 4th-and-7 at the Giants' 37-yard line. The Giants took a 7–3 lead on their first possession of the second quarter, with a 37-yard touchdown pass from quarterback Daniel Jones to wide receiver Sterling Shepard. It was the only time in the game that the Broncos would trail. After tight end Albert Okwuegbunam lost a fumble deep in Giants' territory, the Broncos took the lead for good with 24 unanswered points. Just before halftime, Bridgewater connected with Patrick on a 2-yard touchdown pass, three plays after another fourth down gamble near midfield. On the initial possession of the second half, Okwuegbunam atoned for his earlier fumble, with a 4-yard touchdown reception from Bridgewater on a 4th-and-1. The drive was extended after a fumble by wide receiver Jerry Jeudy at the Giants' 13-yard line was overturned by a booth review. The Giants advanced deep into Broncos' territory on their next possession; however, Broncos' linebacker Josey Jewell forced a fumble off Jones at the 15-yard line. The Broncos took advantage of the turnover, and increased their lead to 20–7 early in the fourth quarter, with a 36-yard field goal by McManus. The Giants reached the Broncos' 6-yard line with 6:30 remaining in the game, hoping for a rally, but the Broncos' defense forced a turnover on downs. Four plays later, the Broncos put the game out of reach, with a 70-yard touchdown run by running back Melvin Gordon.

==== Week 2: at Jacksonville Jaguars ====
Week 2: Denver Broncos at Jacksonville Jaguars – Game summary

| Quarter | 1 | 2 | 3 | 4 | Total |
|---|---|---|---|---|---|
| **Broncos** | 3 | 7 | 10 | 3 | **23** |
| Jaguars | 7 | 0 | 0 | 6 | **13** |

at TIAA Bank Stadium, Jacksonville, Florida

- Date: September 19
- Game time: 1:00 p.m. EDT/11:00 a.m. MDT
- Game weather: Cloudy, 78 °F (26 °C)
- Game attendance: 58,461
- Referee: Clay Martin
- TV announcers (CBS): Spero Dedes and Jay Feely
- Recap, Game Book

Game information

**First quarter**

- JAX – Marvin Jones 25-yard pass from Trevor Lawrence (Josh Lambo kick), 9:21. Jaguars 7–0. **Drive: 11 plays, 83 yards, 5:39.**
- DEN – Brandon McManus 32-yard field goal, 0:26. Jaguars 7–3. **Drive: 13 plays, 61 yards, 8:55.**

**Second quarter**

- DEN – Tim Patrick 12-yard pass from Teddy Bridgewater (Brandon McManus kick), 1:54. Broncos 10–7. **Drive: 8 plays, 80 yards, 4:02.**

**Third quarter**

- DEN – Noah Fant 14-yard pass from Teddy Bridgewater (Brandon McManus kick), 12:35. Broncos 17–7. **Drive: 4 plays, 75 yards, 2:25.**
- DEN – Brandon McManus 46-yard field goal, 1:04. Broncos 20–7. **Drive: 7 plays, 24 yards, 3:19.**

**Fourth quarter**

- DEN – Brandon McManus 40-yard field goal, 5:42. Broncos 23–7. **Drive: 9 plays, 72 yards, 4:49.**
- JAX – Jamal Agnew 102–yard kick return (pass failed), 5:26. Broncos 23–13.

**Top passers**

- DEN – Teddy Bridgewater – 26/34, 328 yards, 2 TD
- JAX – Trevor Lawrence – 14/33, 118 yards, TD, 2 INT

**Top rushers**

- DEN – Javonte Williams – 13 rushes, 64 yards
- JAX – James Robinson – 11 rushes, 47 yards

**Top receivers**

- DEN – Courtland Sutton – 9 receptions, 159 yards
- JAX – Marvin Jones – 6 receptions, 55 yards, TD

After surrendering a 25-yard touchdown pass from Jaguars' quarterback Trevor Lawrence to wide receiver Marvin Jones on the game's opening drive, the Broncos reeled off 23 unanswered points. After getting on the scoreboard with a 32-yard field goal by placekicker Brandon McManus, quarterback Teddy Bridgewater threw a pair of touchdown passes—a 12-yarder to wide receiver Tim Patrick in the second quarter, followed in the third quarter by a 14-yarder to tight end Noah Fant. Jaguars' placekicker Josh Lambo missed on two field goal attempts in the second quarter, while McManus added two more field goals—a 46-yarder late in the third quarter, followed by a 50-yarder with 5:42 remaining in the game. After the latter field goal, Jaguars' return specialist Jamal Agnew returned the ensuing kickoff 102 yards for a touchdown that pulled the Jaguars to within a 23–13 deficit. However, the Broncos' defense denied the two-point conversion attempt that would have pulled the Jaguars to within a one-score deficit. The Broncos then proceeded to run out the clock.

==== Week 3: vs. New York Jets ====
Week 3: New York Jets at Denver Broncos – Game summary

| Quarter | 1 | 2 | 3 | 4 | Total |
|---|---|---|---|---|---|
| Jets | 0 | 0 | 0 | 0 | **0** |
| **Broncos** | 7 | 10 | 3 | 6 | **26** |

at Empower Field at Mile High, Denver, Colorado

- Date: September 26
- Game time: 2:05 p.m. MDT
- Game weather: Sunny, 85 °F (29 °C)
- Game attendance: 75,882
- Referee: Land Clark
- TV announcers (CBS): Spero Dedes and Jay Feely
- Recap, Game Book

Game information

**First quarter**

- DEN – Javonte Williams 1-yard run (Brandon McManus kick), 3:27. Broncos 7–0. **Drive: 11 plays, 75 yards, 7:10.**

**Second quarter**

- DEN – Brandon McManus 45-yard field goal, 14:50. Broncos 10–0. **Drive: 6 plays, 37 yards, 1:59.**
- DEN – Melvin Gordon 1-yard run (Brandon McManus kick), 0:56. Broncos 17–0. **Drive: 9 plays, 64 yards, 2:42.**

**Third quarter**

- DEN – Brandon McManus 47-yard field goal, 9:23. Broncos 20–0. **Drive: 8 plays, 37 yards, 4:37.**

**Fourth quarter**

- DEN – Brandon McManus 21-yard field goal, 6:41. Broncos 23–0. **Drive: 11 plays, 71 yards, 7:33.**
- DEN – Brandon McManus 36-yard field goal, 1:00. Broncos 26–0. **Drive: 6 plays, 12 yards, 2:02.**

**Top passers**

- NYJ – Zach Wilson – 19/35, 160 yards, 2 INT
- DEN – Teddy Bridgewater – 19/25, 235 yards

**Top rushers**

- NYJ – Michael Carter – 9 rushes, 24 yards
- DEN – Melvin Gordon – 18 rushes, 61 yards, TD

**Top receivers**

- NYJ – Corey Davis – 5 receptions, 41 yards
- DEN – Tim Patrick – 5 receptions, 98 yards

The Broncos' defense sacked Jets' rookie quarterback Zach Wilson five times and forced two interceptions, in a dominating 26–0 win. Offensively, running backs Javonte Williams and Melvin Gordon each rushed for a 1-yard touchdown, and placekicker Brandon McManus added four field goals. It was the Broncos' second consecutive shutout of the Jets in Denver, following a 23–0 win in 2017. The Broncos started 3–0 for the first time since 2016.

==== Week 4: vs. Baltimore Ravens ====
Week 4: Baltimore Ravens at Denver Broncos – Game summary

| Quarter | 1 | 2 | 3 | 4 | Total |
|---|---|---|---|---|---|
| **Ravens** | 0 | 17 | 0 | 6 | **23** |
| Broncos | 0 | 7 | 0 | 0 | **7** |

at Empower Field at Mile High, Denver, Colorado

- Date: October 3
- Game time: 2:25 p.m. MDT
- Game weather: Sunny, 76 °F (24 °C)
- Game attendance: 76,490
- Referee: Craig Wrolstad
- TV announcers (CBS): Andrew Catalon, James Lofton and Amanda Balionis
- Recap, Game Book

Game information

**First quarter**

- No scoring plays.

**Second quarter**

- DEN – Noah Fant 3-yard pass from Teddy Bridgewater (Brandon McManus kick), 14:18. Broncos 7–0. **Drive: 5 plays, 57 yards, 2:07.**
- BAL – Latavius Murray 11-yard run (Justin Tucker kick), 10:21. Tied 7–7. **Drive: 8 plays, 75 yards, 3:57.**
- BAL – Marquise Brown 49-yard pass from Lamar Jackson (Justin Tucker kick), 7:09. Ravens 14–7. **Drive: 4 plays, 60 yards, 1:27.**
- BAL – Justin Tucker 40-yard field goal, 0:00. Ravens 17–7. **Drive: 5 plays, 4 yards, 0:31.**

**Third quarter**

- No scoring plays.

**Fourth quarter**

- BAL – Justin Tucker 46-yard field goal, 13:37. Ravens 20–7. **Drive: 13 plays, 48 yards, 5:41.**
- BAL – Justin Tucker 20-yard field goal, 1:51. Ravens 23–7. **Drive: 15 plays, 78 yards, 6:35.**

**Top passers**

- BAL – Lamar Jackson – 22/37, 316 yards, TD
- DEN – Drew Lock – 12/21, 112 yards, INT

**Top rushers**

- BAL – Latavius Murray – 18 rushes, 59 yards, TD
- DEN – Melvin Gordon – 9 rushes, 57 yards

**Top receivers**

- BAL – Marquise Brown – 4 receptions, 91 yards, TD
- DEN – Courtland Sutton – 3 receptions, 47 yards

The Broncos' offense struggled and the defense surrendered 405 yards, in a 23–7 loss to the Ravens. After a scoreless first quarter, the Broncos took a 7–0 lead early in the second quarter, with a 3-yard touchdown pass from quarterback Teddy Bridgewater to tight end Noah Fant. However, the Broncos' offense sputtered for the remainder of the game, and Bridgewater entered concussion protocol just before halftime. Backup quarterback Drew Lock took over in the second half, and was sacked five times. The Broncos went 3-for-14 on third down, failed to cross midfield until their last possession, when Lock was intercepted in the end zone with only ten seconds remaining in the game, and the Broncos trailing 23–7. Defensively, the Broncos' yielded two touchdowns in the second quarter—an 11-yard run by Ravens' running back Latavius Murray and a 49-yard pass from quarterback Lamar Jackson to wide receiver Marquise Brown. Placekicker Justin Tucker added three field goals—a 40-yarder at the end of the first half, followed by a 46- and 20-yarder in the fourth quarter.

==== Week 5: at Pittsburgh Steelers ====
Week 5: Denver Broncos at Pittsburgh Steelers – Game summary

| Quarter | 1 | 2 | 3 | 4 | Total |
|---|---|---|---|---|---|
| Broncos | 3 | 3 | 0 | 13 | **19** |
| **Steelers** | 7 | 10 | 7 | 3 | **27** |

at Heinz Field, Pittsburgh, Pennsylvania

- Date: October 10
- Game time: 1:00 p.m. EDT/11:00 a.m. MDT
- Game weather: Sunny, 73 °F (23 °C)
- Game attendance: 59,841
- Referee: Brad Rogers
- TV announcers (Fox): Brandon Gaudin, Mark Schlereth and Sarah Kustok
- Recap, Game Book

Game information

**First quarter**

- PIT – Diontae Johnson 50-yard pass from Ben Roethlisberger (Chris Boswell kick), 12:02. Steelers 7–0. **Drive: 6 plays, 85 yards, 2:58.**
- DEN – Brandon McManus 39-yard field goal, 1:43. Steelers 7–3. **Drive: 4 plays, 8 yards, 2:14.**

**Second quarter**

- PIT – Chris Boswell 48-yard field goal, 12:42. Steelers 10–3. **Drive: 9 plays, 45 yards, 4:01.**
- DEN – Brandon McManus 29-yard field goal, 5:47. Steelers 10–6. **Drive: 7 plays, 49 yards, 4:17.**
- PIT – Najee Harris 1-yard run (Chris Boswell kick), 2:12. Steelers 17–6. **Drive: 6 plays, 75 yards, 3:35.**

**Third quarter**

- PIT – Chase Claypool 18-yard pass from Ben Roethlisberger (Chris Boswell kick), 2:41. Steelers 24–6. **Drive: 14 plays, 86 yards, 7:16.**

**Fourth quarter**

- DEN – Kendall Hinton 2-yard pass from Teddy Bridgewater (Brandon McManus kick), 10:15. Steelers 24–13. **Drive: 14 plays, 75 yards, 7:26.**
- DEN – Courtland Sutton 39-yard pass from Teddy Bridgewater (pass failed), 5:46. Steelers 24–19. **Drive: 5 plays, 72 yards, 1:54.**
- PIT – Chris Boswell 43-yard field goal, 2:29. Steelers 27–19. **Drive: 7 plays, 49 yards, 3:17.**

**Top passers**

- DEN – Teddy Bridgewater – 24/38, 288 yards, 2 TD, INT
- PIT – Ben Roethlisberger – 15/25, 253 yards, 2 TD

**Top rushers**

- DEN – Javonte Williams – 8 rushes, 61 yards
- PIT – Najee Harris – 23 rushes, 122 yards, TD

**Top receivers**

- DEN – Courtland Sutton – 7 receptions, 120 yards, TD
- PIT – Chase Claypool – 5 receptions, 130 yards, TD

A slow offensive start and three critical penalties proved costly for the Broncos, in a 27–19 loss to the Steelers. The Broncos trailed 10–3 after the defense surrendered a 50-yard touchdown pass from Steelers' quarterback Ben Roethlisberger to wide receiver Diontae Johnson on the game's opening drive, followed by a 48-yard field goal by placekicker Chris Boswell. In between, a 39-yard field goal by placekicker Brandon McManus got the Broncos on the scoreboard late in the first quarter. Midway through the second quarter, the Broncos reached the Steelers' 2-yard line after running back Javonte Williams was stopped just short of the goal line following a 49-yard run. However, Williams was flagged for a 5-yard delay of game penalty after spiking the football in anger. The Broncos lost 10 more yards after quarterback Teddy Bridgewater was sacked, forcing the Broncos to settle for a 29-yard field goal by McManus. On the Steelers' ensuing possession, Broncos' cornerback Kyle Fuller was flagged for a defensive pass interference penalty on a 3rd-and-15 from the 18-yard line. Instead of forcing a field goal attempt, the Steelers capitalized and increased their lead to 17–6 just before the two-minute warning, with a 1-yard touchdown run by running back Najee Harris.

The Broncos' offense stalled near midfield on the opening possession of the second half, and the Steelers methodically marched down to the Broncos' 33-yard line, and Boswell kicked a 51-yard field goal. However, Broncos' defensive end Dre'Mont Jones was flagged for a 15-yard leverage penalty on the field goal attempt, and instead of taking the three points, the Steelers elected for the first down. Three plays later, Roethlisberger connected with wide receiver Chase Claypool on an 18-yard touchdown to give the Steelers a 24–6 lead late in the third quarter. The Broncos' offense finally got into the end zone on their next possession, with a 2-yard touchdown pass from Bridgewater to wide receiver Kendall Hinton. After forcing a Steelers' punt, the Broncos narrowed the Steelers lead to 24–19, with wide receiver Courtland Sutton, playing on his 26th birthday, receiving a 39-yard touchdown pass from Bridgewater with 5:54 remaining in the game. However, the two-point conversion attempt was unsuccessful. The Steelers responded, with a 43-yard field goal by Boswell with 2:33 remaining in the game. Without any timeouts, the Broncos had one last possession, and faced a 4th-and-goal at the 3-yard line with 17 seconds remaining. However, Bridgewater was intercepted by Steelers' cornerback James Pierre in the end zone, ending the Broncos' rally attempt.

==== Week 6: vs. Las Vegas Raiders ====
Week 6: Las Vegas Raiders at Denver Broncos – Game summary

| Quarter | 1 | 2 | 3 | 4 | Total |
|---|---|---|---|---|---|
| **Raiders** | 10 | 7 | 14 | 3 | **34** |
| Broncos | 7 | 0 | 3 | 14 | **24** |

at Empower Field at Mile High, Denver, Colorado

- Date: October 17
- Game time: 2:25 p.m. MDT
- Game weather: Sunny, 69 °F (21 °C)
- Game attendance: 76,854
- Referee: Ronald Torbert
- TV announcers (CBS): Andrew Catalon, James Lofton and Amanda Balionis
- Recap, Game Book

Game information

**First quarter**

- (11:54) LV – Henry Ruggs 48-yard pass from Derek Carr, (Daniel Carlson kick)
  **Raiders 7–0;** Drive: 6 plays, 75 yards, 3:06.
- (6:49) DEN – Tim Patrick 23-yard pass from Teddy Bridgewater, (Brandon McManus kick)
  **Tied 7–7;** Drive: 13 plays, 69 yards, 6:04.
- (2:40) LV – Daniel Carlson 50-yard field goal
  **Raiders 10–7;** Drive: 8 plays, 43 yards, 4:09.

**Second quarter**

- (0:30) LV – Kenyan Drake 31-yard pass from Derek Carr, (Daniel Carlson kick)
  **Raiders 17–7;** Drive: 5 plays, 82 yards, 0:31.

**Third quarter**

- (11:27) LV – Kenyan Drake 18-yard run, (Daniel Carlson kick)
  **Raiders 24–7;** Drive: 4 plays, 56 yards, 1:56.
- (2:40) DEN – Brandon McManus 32-yard field goal
  **Raiders 24–10;** Drive: 9 plays, 64 yards, 4:49.
- (0:07) LV – Josh Jacobs 3-yard run, (Daniel Carlson kick)
  **Raiders 31–10;** Drive: 5 plays, 42 yards, 2:12.

**Fourth quarter**

- (11:16) DEN – Courtland Sutton 12-yard pass from Teddy Bridgewater, (Brandon McManus kick)
  **Raiders 31–17;** Drive: 12 plays, 75 yards, 2:51.
- (7:57) LV – Daniel Carlson 30-yard field goal
  **Raiders 34–17;** Drive: 7 plays, 64 yards, 3:19.
- (1:12) DEN – Noah Fant 4-yard pass from Teddy Bridgewater, (Brandon McManus kick)
  **Raiders 34–24;** Drive: 8 plays, 86 yards, 3:51.

**Top passers**

- LV – Derek Carr – 18/27, 341 yards, 2 TD
- DEN – Teddy Bridgewater – 35/49, 334 yards, 3 TD, 3 INT

**Top rushers**

- LV – Josh Jacobs – 16 rushes, 53 yards, TD
- DEN – Javonte Williams – 11 rushes, 53 yards

**Top receivers**

- LV – Henry Ruggs – 3 receptions, 97 yards, TD
- DEN – Noah Fant – 9 receptions, 97 yards, TD

Each team reached the end zone on their initial possessions—Raiders' quarterback Derek Carr connected on a 48-yard touchdown pass to wide receiver Henry Ruggs, while Broncos' quarterback Teddy Bridgewater connected on a 23-yard touchdown pass to wide receiver Tim Patrick. However, the Broncos' struggled on both sides of the ball, and surrendered 17 unanswered points. The defense surrendered seven completions by Carr of at least 25 yards. Following a 50-yard field goal by Raiders' placekicker Daniel Carlson, Bridgewater was intercepted by cornerback Brandon Facyson late in the first quarter; however, Carlson hit the right upright on a 43-yard field goal attempt. Two touchdowns by running back Kenyan Drake—a 31-yard pass from Carr just before halftime, followed by an 18-yard run early in the third quarter—gave the Raiders a 24–7 lead. Following a 32-yard field goal by Broncos' placekicker Brandon McManus and a subsequent Raiders' punt, Bridgewater committed a fumble, and the Raiders extended their lead to 31–10 near the end of the third quarter, with running back Josh Jacobs rushing for a 1-yard touchdown. The Broncos responded on their next possession, with a 12-yard touchdown pass from Bridgewater to wide receiver Courtland Sutton. A 30-yard field goal by Carlson increased the Raiders' lead to 34–17 at the 8-minute mark of the fourth quarter. Following an interception by Bridgewater and a Raiders' punt, the Broncos narrowed the Raiders' lead to 34–24 with only 1:17 remaining in the game, with a 4-yard touchdown pass from Bridgewater to tight end Noah Fant. The Broncos recovered the onside kick, and used their final team timeout with 59 seconds remaining. Two plays later, Bridgewater threw his third interception to end the game.

==== Week 7: at Cleveland Browns ====
Week 7: Denver Broncos at Cleveland Browns – Game summary

| Quarter | 1 | 2 | 3 | 4 | Total |
|---|---|---|---|---|---|
| Broncos | 0 | 0 | 7 | 7 | **14** |
| **Browns** | 10 | 0 | 7 | 0 | **17** |

at FirstEnergy Stadium, Cleveland, Ohio

- Date: October 21
- Game time: 8:20 p.m. EDT/6:20 p.m. MDT
- Game weather: Cloudy, 61 °F (16 °C)
- Game attendance: 67,431
- Referee: Adrian Hill
- TV announcers (Fox/NFLN/Prime Video): Joe Buck, Troy Aikman, Erin Andrews and Kristina Pink
- Recap, Game Book

Game information

**First quarter**

- CLE – D'Ernest Johnson 4-yard run, (Chase McLaughlin kick), 12:20. Browns 7–0. **Drive: 5 plays, 75 yards, 2:40.**
- CLE – Chase McLaughlin 52-yard field goal, 3:09. Browns 10–0. **Drive: 12 plays, 43 yards, 7:04.**

**Second quarter**

- **No scoring plays.**

**Third quarter**

- DEN – Melvin Gordon 8-yard pass from Teddy Bridgewater (Brandon McManus kick), 7:48. Browns 10–7. **Drive: 13 plays, 79 yards, 7:12.**
- CLE – Johnny Stanton 1-yard pass from Case Keenum (Chase McLaughlin kick), 0:27. Browns 17–7. **Drive: 13 plays, 75 yards, 7:21.**

**Fourth quarter**

- DEN – Javonte Williams 10-yard pass from Teddy Bridgewater (Brandon McManus kick), 5:17. Browns 17–14. **Drive: 17 plays, 80 yards, 6:08.**

**Top passers**

- DEN – Teddy Bridgewater – 23/33, 187 yards, 2 TD, INT
- CLE – Case Keenum – 21/33, 199 yards, TD

**Top rushers**

- DEN – Javonte Williams – 4 rushes, 20 yards
- CLE – D'Ernest Johnson – 22 rushes, 146 yards, TD

**Top receivers**

- DEN – Courtland Sutton – 5 receptions, 68 yards
- CLE – Austin Hooper – 2 receptions, 42 yards

The Browns took a 10–0 lead after the first quarter, courtesy of a 4-yard touchdown run by running back D'Ernest Johnson, followed by a 52-yard field goal by placekicker Chase McLaughlin, who later had a 41-yard attempt blocked by Broncos' defensive end Shelby Harris at the 2-minute warning. The Broncos' offense failed to advance past their own 34-yard line on four of their five first half possessions; quarterback Teddy Bridgewater was intercepted in the end zone by Browns' safety John Johnson on a pass from the Browns' 34-yard line in a scoreless second quarter. The Broncos finally got on the scoreboard midway through the third quarter, with Bridgewater connecting with running back Melvin Gordon on an 8-yard touchdown pass. However, the Browns responded on their next possession, with a 1-yard touchdown pass from quarterback Case Keenum to fullback Johnny Stanton near the end of the third quarter. Following an exchange of punts, the Broncos narrowed the deficit to 17–14, with Bridgewater's second touchdown pass of the game—a 10-yarder to running back Javonte Williams with 5:23 remaining in the game. However, the Broncos' defense was unable to prevent the Browns from running out the clock, surrendering 52 rushing yards to D'Ernest Johnson on the Browns' game-clinching drive.

Notes:

With the loss, the Broncos' 6-game winning streak in Cleveland was snapped. The Browns' last home win over the Broncos was a 16–13 victory in 1989.

This was also linebacker Von Miller's final game in a Broncos' uniform. Miller was inactive for the team's next game vs. the Washington Football Team on October 31, and he was traded to the Los Angeles Rams the following day (November 1).

==== Week 8: vs. Washington Football Team ====
Week 8: Washington Football Team at Denver Broncos – Game summary

| Quarter | 1 | 2 | 3 | 4 | Total |
|---|---|---|---|---|---|
| Washington | 0 | 3 | 7 | 0 | **10** |
| **Broncos** | 0 | 10 | 0 | 7 | **17** |

at Empower Field at Mile High, Denver, Colorado

- Date: October 31
- Game time: 2:25 p.m. MDT
- Game weather: Cloudy, 40 °F (4 °C)
- Game attendance: 75,973
- Referee: John Hussey
- TV announcers (Fox): Brandon Gaudin, Mark Schlereth and Shannon Spake
- Recap, Game Book

Game information

**First quarter**

- No scoring plays.

**Second quarter**

- DEN – Brandon McManus 45-yard field goal, 10:27. Broncos 3–0. **Drive: 7 plays, 38 yards, 3:15.**
- WAS – Chris Blewitt 52-yard field goal, 5:25. Tied 3–3. **Drive: 10 plays, 41 yards, 5:02.**
- DEN – Melvin Gordon 15-yard pass from Teddy Bridgewater (Brandon McManus kick), 1:11. Broncos 10–3. **Drive: 7 plays, 75 yards, 4:14.**

**Third quarter**

- WAS – DeAndre Carter 20-yard pass from Taylor Heinicke (Chris Blewitt kick), 0:38. Tied 10–10. **Drive: 10 plays, 94 yards, 6:24.**

**Fourth quarter**

- DEN – Melvin Gordon 7-yard run (Brandon McManus kick), 4:27. Broncos 17–10. **Drive: 8 plays, 63 yards, 4:28.**

**Top passers**

- WAS – Taylor Heinicke – 24/39, 270 yards, TD, 2 INT
- DEN – Teddy Bridgewater – 19/26, 213 yards, TD

**Top rushers**

- KC – Jaret Patterson – 11 rushes, 46 yards
- DEN – Melvin Gordon – 10 rushes, 47 yards, TD

**Top receivers**

- WAS – J. D. McKissic – 8 receptions, 83 yards
- DEN – Tim Patrick – 3 receptions, 64 yards

Following a scoreless first quarter, each team exchanged field goals—a 45-yarder by Broncos' placekicker Brandon McManus and a 52-yarder by Washington placekicker Chris Blewitt; the latter also had a 45-yard attempt blocked by Broncos' defensive end Shelby Harris early in the second quarter. The Broncos took a 10–3 lead just before halftime, with quarterback Teddy Bridgewater connecting with running back Melvin Gordon on a 15-yard touchdown pass. Following an exchange of punts to begin the second half, Washington tied the game, with a 20-yard touchdown pass from quarterback Taylor Heinicke to wide receiver DeAndre Carter near the end of the third quarter. McManus missed wide right on a 53-yard attempt on the Broncos' first possession of the fourth quarter. Washington attempted to take the lead on their next possession, and reached the Broncos' 29-yard line; however, Blewitt's field goal attempt from 47 yards out was blocked again—this one by defensive end Dre'mont Jones at the 9-minute mark of the fourth quarter. Eight plays later, Gordon's second touchdown of the game—a 7-yard run—gave the Broncos a 17–10 lead with 4:31 remaining in the game.

Washington marched down to the Broncos' 11-yard line with 2:37 remaining, hoping for a rally. Following two short completions and the two-minute warning, Heinicke was sacked by linebacker Malik Reed for a 13-yard loss at the 20-yard line. On 4th-and-19, Heinicke was intercepted in the end zone by safety Justin Simmons, ending the threat. With only 37 seconds remaining in the game, the Broncos' attempted to run out the clock. However, after a 1-yard run by running back Javonte Williams, a Washington timeout and an incomplete pass by Bridgewater, Gordon lost a fumble, and Washington recovered at the Broncos' 24-yard line, with only 21 seconds remaining in the game. However, the Broncos' defense subdued Washington's last rally attempt, sacking Heinicke on second down, forcing three incomplete passes and the exhaustion of Washington's two remaining timeouts.

==== Week 9: at Dallas Cowboys ====
Week 9: Denver Broncos at Dallas Cowboys – Game summary

| Quarter | 1 | 2 | 3 | 4 | Total |
|---|---|---|---|---|---|
| **Broncos** | 6 | 10 | 3 | 11 | **30** |
| Cowboys | 0 | 0 | 0 | 16 | **16** |

at AT&T Stadium, Arlington, Texas

- Date: November 7
- Game time: 12:00 p.m. CST/11:00 a.m. MST
- Game weather: None (retractable roof closed)
- Game attendance: 93,503
- Referee: Bill Vinovich
- TV announcers (Fox): Kevin Burkhardt, Greg Olsen and Pam Oliver
- Recap, Game Book

Game information

**First quarter**

- DEN – Melvin Gordon 3-yard run (kick failed), 1:48. Broncos 6–0. **Drive: 11 plays, 80 yards, 6:19.**

**Second quarter**

- DEN – Tim Patrick 44-yard pass from Teddy Bridgewater (Brandon McManus kick), 12:13. Broncos 13–0. **Drive: 6 plays, 80 yards, 2:47.**
- DEN – Brandon McManus 53-yard field goal, 3:41. Broncos 16–0. **Drive: 11 plays, 45 yards, 7:07.**

**Third quarter**

- DEN – Brandon McManus 27-yard field goal, 8:08. Broncos 19–0. **Drive: 13 plays, 68 yards, 6:52.**

**Fourth quarter**

- DEN – Teddy Bridgewater 1-yard run (Teddy Bridgewater-Courtland Sutton pass), 11:18. Broncos 27–0. **Drive: 13 plays, 85 yards, 7:30.**
- DEN – Brandon McManus 42-yard field goal, 6:32. Broncos 30–0. **Drive: 5 plays, 15 yards, 3:15.**
- DAL – Malik Turner 5-yard pass from Dak Prescott (Ezekiel Elliott run), 4:08. Broncos 30–8. **Drive: 9 plays, 75 yards, 2:24.**
- DAL – Malik Turner 4-yard pass from Dak Prescott (Ezekiel Elliott run), 0:55. Broncos 30–16. **Drive: 11 plays, 65 yards, 2:08.**

**Top passers**

- DEN – Teddy Bridgewater – 19/28, 249 yards, TD
- DAL – Dak Prescott – 19/39, 232 yards, 2 TD, INT

**Top rushers**

- DEN – Javonte Williams – 17 rushes, 111 yards
- DAL – Ezekiel Elliott – 10 rushes, 51 yards

**Top receivers**

- DEN – Tim Patrick – 4 receptions, 85 yards, TD
- DAL – Dalton Schultz – 4 receptions, 54 yards

The Broncos dominated the Cowboys on both sides of the ball and controlled the time of possession by a 2–1 margin, in a dominating and surprising 30–16 road win. Quarterback Teddy Bridgewater threw a 44-yard touchdown pass to wide receiver Tim Patrick and rushed for a 1-yard sneak, and running back Melvin Gordon rushed for a 3-yard touchdown. Placekicker Brandon McManus added three field goals—from 27, 42 and 53 yards out. In the first game of the post-Von Miller era, the Broncos' defense limited the Cowboys' No. 1 ranked offense to 290 total yards and denied the Cowboys on four 4th-down attempts. The Broncos led 30–0 with four minutes remaining in the game, and the defense surrendered two touchdown pass from Cowboys' quarterback Dak Prescott to wide receiver Malik Turner (with two successful two-point conversions), but well after the outcome had already been decided in the Broncos' favor. With the win, the Broncos extended their winning streak against the Cowboys to seven games, dating back to 1998.

==== Week 10: vs. Philadelphia Eagles ====
Week 10: Philadelphia Eagles at Denver Broncos – Game summary

| Quarter | 1 | 2 | 3 | 4 | Total |
|---|---|---|---|---|---|
| **Eagles** | 10 | 10 | 7 | 3 | **30** |
| Broncos | 0 | 10 | 3 | 0 | **13** |

at Empower Field at Mile High, Denver, Colorado

- Date: November 14
- Game time: 2:25 p.m. MST
- Game weather: Partly cloudy, 65 °F (18 °C)
- Game attendance: 76,766
- Referee: Shawn Hochuli
- TV announcers (CBS): Greg Gumbel, Adam Archuleta and AJ Ross
- Recap, Game Book

Game information

**First quarter**

- PHI – Jake Elliott 30-yard field goal, 10:13. Eagles 3–0. **Drive: 10 plays, 63 yards, 4:47.**
- PHI – DeVonta Smith 36-yard pass from Jalen Hurts (Jake Elliott kick), 3:16. Eagles 10–0. **Drive: 9 plays, 80 yards, 5:27.**

**Second quarter**

- DEN – Melvin Gordon 1-yard run (Brandon McManus kick), 13:38. Eagles 10–7. **Drive: 9 plays, 75 yards, 4:38.**
- DEN – Brandon McManus 21-yard field goal, 9:39. Tied 10–10. **Drive: 5 plays, 69 yards, 1:47.**
- PHI – DeVonta Smith 5-yard pass from Jalen Hurts (Jake Elliott kick), 3:07. Eagles 17–10. **Drive: 12 plays, 75 yards, 6:32.**
- PHI – Jake Elliott 52-yard field goal, 0:05. Eagles 20–10. **Drive: 9 plays, 51 yards, 1:44.**

**Third quarter**

- DEN – Brandon McManus 28-yard field goal, 4:51. Eagles 20–13. **Drive: 10 plays, 35 yards, 4:10.**
- PHI – Darius Slay 83-yard fumble return (Jake Elliott kick), 0:00. Eagles 27–13.

**Fourth quarter**

- PHI – Jake Elliott 23-yard field goal, 7:36. Eagles 30–13. **Drive: 10 plays, 60 yards, 5:57.**

**Top passers**

- PHI – Jalen Hurts – 16/23, 178 yards, 2 TD, INT
- DEN – Teddy Bridgewater – 22/36, 226 yards

**Top rushers**

- PHI – Jordan Howard – 12 rushes, 83 yards
- DEN – Javonte Williams – 8 rushes, 48 yards

**Top receivers**

- PHI – DeVonta Smith – 4 receptions, 66 yards, 2 TD
- DEN – Albert Okwuegbunam – 3 receptions, 77 yards

The Broncos fell behind 10–0 in the first quarter, with a 30-yard field goal by Eagles' placekicker Jake Elliott, followed by a 36-yard touchdown pass from quarterback Jalen Hurts to wide receiver DeVonta Smith. The Broncos got on the scoreboard in the second quarter, with a 1-yard touchdown run by running back Melvin Gordon. However, after forcing an Eagles' punt, the Broncos reached the red zone, but were forced to settle on a 21-yard field goal by placekicker Brandon McManus. Another touchdown pass from Hurts to Smith—from five yards out—coupled with a 52-yard field goal by Elliott just before halftime, gave the Eagles a 20–10 lead. The Broncos took the opening possession of the second half, and reached the Eagles' 4-yard line. However, the Broncos squandered another red zone opportunity, as McManus' 21-yard field goal attempt was blocked by Eagles' safety K'Von Wallace. After forcing the Eagles to go three-and-out, the Broncos reached the red zone yet again; however, running back Javonte Williams had a 20-yard touchdown run nullified by a holding penalty on tight end Eric Saubert. The Broncos were once again forced to settle for another short field goal by McManus—from 28 yards out. After an interception of Hurts by safety Justin Simmons, the Broncos were attempting to tie the game, and reached the Eagles' 23-yard line; however, Gordon lost a fumble, and Eagles' safety Darius Slay recovered the football and ran for an 83-yard touchdown at the end of the third quarter to give the Eagles a 27–13 lead. Elliott later added a 23-yard field goal midway through the fourth quarter to put the game out of reach. The Broncos' offense went 1-for-11 on third down, scored only one touchdown out of five red zone opportunities, and defensively, surrendered 214 rushing yards to Eagles' running backs.

==== Week 12: vs. Los Angeles Chargers ====
Week 12: Los Angeles Chargers at Denver Broncos – Game summary

| Quarter | 1 | 2 | 3 | 4 | Total |
|---|---|---|---|---|---|
| Chargers | 0 | 7 | 0 | 6 | **13** |
| **Broncos** | 7 | 7 | 0 | 14 | **28** |

at Empower Field at Mile High, Denver, Colorado

- Date: November 28
- Game time: 2:05 p.m. MST
- Game weather: Partly cloudy, 66 °F (19 °C)
- Game attendance: 75,807
- Referee: Land Clark
- TV announcers (CBS): Greg Gumbel, Adam Archuleta and AJ Ross
- Recap, Game Book

Game information

**First quarter**

- DEN – Teddy Bridgewater 11-yard run (Brandon McManus kick), 4:31. Broncos 7–0. **Drive: 8 plays, 50 yards, 4:24.**

**Second quarter**

- DEN – Javonte Williams 9-yard run (Brandon McManus kick), 12:46. Broncos 14–0. **Drive: 11 plays, 75 yards, 5:46.**
- LAC – Austin Ekeler 12-yard pass from Justin Herbert (Dustin Hopkins kick), 0:31. Broncos 14–7. **Drive: 6 plays, 47 yards, 0:45.**

**Third quarter**

- No scoring plays.

**Fourth quarter**

- DEN – Eric Saubert 1-yard pass from Teddy Bridgewater (Brandon McManus kick), 8:54. Broncos 21–7. **Drive: 10 plays, 80 yards, 5:36.**
- DEN – Patrick Surtain II 70-yard interception return (Brandon McManus kick), 7:28. Broncos 28–7.
- LAC – Jared Cook 16-yard pass from Justin Herbert (pass failed), 4:34. Broncos 28–13. **Drive: 9 plays, 75 yards, 2:54.**

**Top passers**

- LAC – Justin Herbert – 28/44, 303 yards, 2 TD, 2 INT
- DEN – Teddy Bridgewater – 11/18, 129 yards, TD

**Top rushers**

- LAC – Justin Herbert – 4 rushes, 36 yards
- DEN – Melvin Gordon – 17 rushes, 83 yards

**Top receivers**

- LAC – Keenan Allen – 7 receptions, 85 yards
- DEN – Javonte Williams – 3 receptions, 57 yards

A pair of rushing touchdowns—an 11-yarder by quarterback Teddy Bridgewater in the first quarter, followed in the second quarter by a 9-yarder by running back Javonte Williams—gave the Broncos a 14–0 lead over the Chargers. After Bridgewater briefly exited with a lower leg injury late in the first quarter, backup quarterback Drew Lock took over, and completed four passes in seven attempts for only 26 yards, before throwing an interception near midfield with 1:22 remaining in the first half. The Chargers capitalized and got on the scoreboard just before halftime, with a 12-yard touchdown pass from quarterback Justin Herbert to running back Austin Ekeler. The Chargers took the opening possession of the second half, and reached the Broncos' 34-yard line; however, placekicker Dustin Hopkins missed wide left on a 52-yard field goal attempt. After a Broncos' punt, the Chargers once again drove deep into Broncos' territory at the end of a scoreless third quarter, and the Broncos holding on to a 14–7 lead. On the second play of the fourth quarter, with the Chargers facing a 3rd-and-14 from the 23-yard line, Broncos' cornerback Patrick Surtain II made the first of two key interceptions—picking off a pass from Herbert intended for tight end Jared Cook in the end zone for a touchback. The Broncos added to their lead, with Bridgewater's return to the game, and a 10-play, 80-yard drive that culminated in a 1-yard touchdown pass to tight end Eric Saubert. On the Chargers' ensuing possession, Surtain intercepted a pass from Herbert that went through the hands of Ekeler, and scampered down the left sideline for a 70-yard touchdown that put the game out of reach midway through the fourth quarter. The Chargers managed only one more scoring play—a 16-yard touchdown pass from Herbert to Cook (with an unsuccessful two-point conversion attempt) on the ensuing possession, but got no closer.

==== Week 13: at Kansas City Chiefs ====
Week 13: Denver Broncos at Kansas City Chiefs – Game summary

| Quarter | 1 | 2 | 3 | 4 | Total |
|---|---|---|---|---|---|
| Broncos | 0 | 3 | 0 | 6 | **9** |
| **Chiefs** | 10 | 0 | 3 | 9 | **22** |

at Arrowhead Stadium, Kansas City, Missouri

- Date: December 5
- Game time: 7:20 p.m. CST/6:20 p.m. MST
- Game weather: 55 °F (13 °C)
- Game attendance: 73,185
- Referee: Carl Cheffers
- TV announcers (NBC): Al Michaels, Cris Collinsworth and Kathryn Tappen
- Recap, Game Book

Game information

**First quarter**

- KC – Patrick Mahomes 10-yard run (Harrison Butker kick), 6:56. Chiefs 7–0. **Drive: 12 plays, 72 yards, 6:03.**
- KC – Harrison Butker 56-yard field goal, 2:22. Chiefs 10–0. **Drive: 9 plays, 42 yards, 3:30.**

**Second quarter**

- DEN – Brandon McManus 42-yard field goal, 13:34. Chiefs 10–3. **Drive: 10 plays, 51 yards, 3:48.**

**Third quarter**

- KC – Harrison Butker 45-yard field goal, 5:35. Chiefs 13–3. **Drive: 7 plays, 50 yards, 3:23.**

**Fourth quarter**

- KC – Harrison Butker 26-yard field goal, 13:26. Chiefs 16–3. **Drive: 4 plays, 8 yards, 1:34.**
- KC – Daniel Sorensen 75-yard interception return (kick failed), 9:42. Chiefs 22–3.
- DEN – Javonte Williams 13-yard pass from Teddy Bridgewater (pass failed), 5:12. Chiefs 22–9. **Drive: 11 plays, 75 yards, 4:30.**

**Top passers**

- DEN – Teddy Bridgewater – 22/40, 257 yards, TD, 2 INT
- KC – Patrick Mahomes – 15/29, 184 yards, INT

**Top rushers**

- DEN – Javonte Williams – 23 rushes, 102 yards
- KC – Clyde Edwards-Helaire – 14 rushes, 54 yards

**Top receivers**

- DEN – Jerry Jeudy – 4 receptions, 77 yards
- KC – Darrel Williams – 3 receptions, 60 yards

The Broncos' defense limited the Chiefs to 267 total yards of offense and quarterback Patrick Mahomes to 184 yards passing, but their defensive effort was wasted by missed opportunities by their offense and nullified by three costly second half turnovers. The Broncos gained only two net yards in their first two offensive possessions and fell behind 10–0 after a 10-yard touchdown run by Mahomes and a 56-yard field goal by Chiefs' placekicker Harrison Butker. The Broncos got on the scoreboard early in the second quarter, with a 42-yard field goal by placekicker Brandon McManus. After forcing a Chiefs' punt, the Broncos went on a 10-play, 16-yard drive that devoured 10 minutes, but instead of kicking a field goal, the Broncos came up empty at the Chiefs' 8-yard line, after running back Javonte Williams was stopped for a 1-yard loss on 4th-and-2. On the opening possession of the second half, the Broncos were unable to capitalize on an interception of Mahomes by cornerback Patrick Surtain II, and were forced to punt after a three-and-out. A 45-yard field goal by Butker increased the Chiefs' lead to 13–3 at the 5:39 mark of the third quarter. The Broncos blew yet another opportunity, when quarterback Teddy Bridgewater was intercepted by safety Juan Thornhill at the Chiefs' 45-yard line. Eight plays later, Butker's third field goal of the game—from 26 yards out—increased the Chiefs' lead to 16–3 early in the third quarter. The Broncos reached the Chiefs' 27-yard line on their next possession; however, Bridgewater's pass was deflected and intercepted by Chiefs' safety Daniel Sorensen for a 75-yard touchdown (with a missed extra-point attempt). The Broncos' finally reached the end zone, with a 13-yard touchdown pass from Bridgewater to Williams; however the two-point conversion attempt was unsuccessful, keeping the score at 22–9 with 5:19 remaining in the game. The Broncos forced a Chiefs' punt, and in the process, burned two of their team timeouts, hoping for a rally with 2:43 remaining in the game. However, they turned the football over on downs near midfield.

==== Week 14: vs. Detroit Lions ====
Week 14: Detroit Lions at Denver Broncos – Game summary

| Quarter | 1 | 2 | 3 | 4 | Total |
|---|---|---|---|---|---|
| Lions | 0 | 10 | 0 | 0 | **10** |
| **Broncos** | 14 | 3 | 14 | 7 | **38** |

at Empower Field at Mile High, Denver, Colorado

- Date: December 12
- Game time: 2:05 p.m. MST
- Game weather: Partly cloudy, 61 °F (16 °C)
- Game attendance: 76,211
- Referee: John Hussey
- TV announcers (Fox): Kevin Kugler, Mark Sanchez and Laura Okmin
- Recap, Game Book

Game information

**First quarter**

- DEN – Javonte Williams 5-yard run (Brandon McManus kick), 9:46. Broncos 7–0. **Drive: 11 plays, 75 yards, 5:14.**
- DEN – Melvin Gordon 1-yard run (Brandon McManus kick), 0:53. Broncos 14–0. **Drive: 12 plays, 74 yards, 7:16.**

**Second quarter**

- DET – Kalif Raymond 7-yard pass from Jared Goff (Riley Patterson kick), 12:31. Broncos 14–7. **Drive: 7 plays, 75 yards, 3:22.**
- DET – Riley Patterson 36-yard field goal, 6:34. Broncos 14–10. **Drive: 11 plays, 57 yards, 5:10.**
- DEN – Brandon McManus 52-yard field goal, 0:00. Broncos 17–10. **Drive: 9 plays, 44 yards, 1:05.**

**Third quarter**

- DEN – Javonte Williams 10-yard pass from Teddy Bridgewater (Brandon McManus kick), 11:03. Broncos 24–10. **Drive: 5 plays, 36 yards, 3:08.**
- DEN – Melvin Gordon 14-yard run (Brandon McManus kick), 6:34. Broncos 31–10. **Drive: 4 plays, 33 yards, 2:13.**

**Fourth quarter**

- DEN – Albert Okwuegbunam 4-yard pass from Teddy Bridgewater (Brandon McManus kick), 1:51. Broncos 38–10. **Drive: 14 plays, 88 yards, 7:08.**

**Top passers**

- DET – Jared Goff – 24/39, 215 yards, TD, INT
- DEN – Teddy Bridgewater – 18/25, 179 yards, 2 TD

**Top rushers**

- DET – Craig Reynolds – 11 rushes, 83 yards
- DEN – Melvin Gordon – 24 rushes, 111 yards, 2 TD

**Top receivers**

- DET – Amon-Ra St. Brown – 8 receptions, 73 yards
- DEN – Noah Fant – 4 receptions, 51 yards

Running backs Melvin Gordon and Javonte Williams accounted for four of the Broncos' five touchdowns—two rushing by Gordon and one rushing and one receiving by Williams—in a 38–10 rout of the Lions. The Broncos dedicated the win to wide receiver Demaryius Thomas, who died three days prior of a medical issue in his Georgia home at the age of 33. Thomas, who played wide receiver for the Broncos from 2010 to 2018, ranks third in franchise history in receptions (behind Shannon Sharpe and Rod Smith), second in receiving yards, touchdowns and single-season receptions (all behind Rod Smith), tied with Anthony Miller for the most touchdowns in a single season, and holds the franchise records for 100-yard receiving games and receiving yardage for both a single-game and a single-season. The Broncos also wore a No. 88 decal on their helmets and had a memorial at the Ring of Fame Plaza in honor of Thomas.

==== Week 15: vs. Cincinnati Bengals ====
Week 15: Cincinnati Bengals at Denver Broncos – Game summary

| Quarter | 1 | 2 | 3 | 4 | Total |
|---|---|---|---|---|---|
| **Bengals** | 3 | 3 | 9 | 0 | **15** |
| Broncos | 0 | 3 | 7 | 0 | **10** |

at Empower Field at Mile High, Denver, Colorado

- Date: December 19
- Game time: 2:05 p.m. MST
- Game weather: Sunny, 61 °F (16 °C)
- Game attendance: 76,134
- Referee: Adrian Hill
- TV announcers (CBS): Ian Eagle, Charles Davis and Evan Washburn
- Recap, Game Book

Game information

**First quarter**

- CIN – Evan McPherson 53-yard field goal, 6:34. Bengals 3–0. **Drive: 8 plays, 33 yards, 3:55.**

**Second quarter**

- DEN – Brandon McManus 54-yard field goal, 10:44. Tied 3–3. **Drive: 5 plays, 32 yards, 1:56.**
- CIN – Evan McPherson 58-yard field goal, 0:00. Bengals 6–3. **Drive: 2 plays, 19 yards, 0:09.**

**Third quarter**

- CIN – Evan McPherson 26-yard field goal, 6:21. Bengals 9–3. **Drive: 11 plays, 72 yards, 5:03.**
- DEN – Tim Patrick 25-yard pass from Drew Lock (Brandon McManus kick), 1:15. Broncos 10–9. **Drive: 9 plays, 75 yards, 5:06.**
- CIN – Tyler Boyd 56-yard pass from Joe Burrow (pass failed), 0:30. Bengals 15–10. **Drive: 2 plays, 68 yards, 0:45.**

**Fourth quarter**

- No scoring plays.

**Top passers**

- CIN – Joe Burrow – 15/22, 157 yards, TD
- DEN – Teddy Bridgewater – 12/22, 98 yards

**Top rushers**

- CIN – Joe Mixon – 17 rushes, 58 yards
- DEN – Javonte Williams – 15 rushes, 72 yards

**Top receivers**

- CIN – Tyler Boyd – 5 receptions, 96 yards, TD
- DEN – Albert Okwuegbunam – 3 receptions, 58 yards

Through the midway point of the third quarter, all of the scoring came by way of the placekickers—53-, 54- and 28-yard field goals by the Bengals' Evan McPherson, and a 54-yard field goal by the Broncos' Brandon McManus. With only 14 seconds before halftime, McManus missed wide-right on a 51-yard attempt, giving the Bengals good field field position. A 40-yard pass completion from Bengals' quarterback Joe Burrow to wide receiver Tyler Boyd set up the 58-yard field goal by McPherson. On the Broncos' second possession of the third quarter, quarterback Teddy Bridgewater suffered a head injury while diving for a first down, and was taken to a Denver-area hospital. Backup quarterback Drew Lock took over for the remainder of the game. Lock connected with wide receiver Tim Patrick on a 25-yard touchdown pass that gave the Broncos a 10–9 lead late in third quarter. However, the Bengals responded two plays later on their next drive, with a 56-yarder touchdown pass from Burrow to Boyd. The Bengals' two-point conversion attempt was unsuccessful, leaving the score at 15–10. The Broncos reached the Bengals' 9-yard line on their next drive; however, Lock was strip-sacked by Bengals' defensive end Khalid Kareem, who advance the football to the Broncos' 42-yard line, before Broncos' offensive tackle Garett Bolles forced a fumble and recovered the football. The Broncos thought they had a new set of downs; however, a booth review revealed that Kareem was ruled down by contact at the 15-yard line after being tackled by Lock. Following an exchange of punts and the exhaustion of all of their team timeouts, the Broncos had one last possession deep in their own territory with only 1:04 remaining in the game, but lost 14 net yards, ending the game.

==== Week 16: at Las Vegas Raiders ====
Week #: Denver Broncos at Las Vegas Raiders – Game summary

| Quarter | 1 | 2 | 3 | 4 | Total |
|---|---|---|---|---|---|
| Broncos | 0 | 13 | 0 | 0 | **13** |
| **Raiders** | 0 | 7 | 7 | 3 | **17** |

at Allegiant Stadium, Paradise, Nevada

- Date: December 26
- Game time: 2:25 p.m. MST/1:25 p.m. PST
- Game weather: None (indoor stadium)
- Game attendance: 60,972
- Referee: Scott Novak
- TV announcers (CBS): Greg Gumbel, Tiki Barber and AJ Ross
- Recap, Game Book

Game information

**First quarter**

- No scoring plays.

**Second quarter**

- LV – Hunter Renfrow 10-yard pass from Derek Carr (Daniel Carlson kick), 11:01. Raiders 7–0. **Drive: 14 plays, 76 yards, 7:24.**
- DEN – Brandon McManus 49-yard field goal, 7:24. Raiders 7–3. **Drive: 5 plays, 44 yards, 3:37.**
- DEN – Brandon McManus 55-yard field goal, 0:32. Raiders 7–6. **Drive: 4 plays, 4 yards, 1:28.**
- DEN – Javonte Williams 1-yard run (Brandon McManus kick), 0:15. Broncos 13–7. **Drive: 1 play, 1 yard, 0:03.**

**Third quarter**

- LV – Peyton Barber 5-yard run (Daniel Carlson kick), 10:22. Raiders 14–13. **Drive: 9 plays, 75 yards, 4:38.**

**Fourth quarter**

- LV – Daniel Carlson 41-yard field goal, 7:35. Raiders 17–13. **Drive: 13 plays, 32 yards, 7:38.**

**Top passers**

- DEN – Drew Lock – 15/22, 153 yards
- LV – Derek Carr – 20/25, 201 yards, TD, INT

**Top rushers**

- DEN – Javonte Williams – 7 rushes, 12 yards, TD
- LV – Josh Jacobs – 27 rushes, 129 yards

**Top receivers**

- DEN – Jerry Jeudy – 3 receptions, 60 yards
- LV – Foster Moreau – 4 receptions, 67 yards

After a scoreless first quarter, the Raiders took the lead early in the second quarter, with a 10-yard touchdown pass from quarterback Derek Carr to wide receiver Hunter Renfrow. The Broncos then scored 13 unanswered points leading up to halftime. First, placekicker Brandon McManus got the Broncos on the scoreboard with a 49-yard field goal. Then, after forcing a fumble off Raiders' running back Josh Jacobs, McManus followed up his first field goal with a 55-yarder. With only 26 seconds before halftime, Broncos' linebacker Bradley Chubb perfectly read a screen pass attempt by Carr and nearly returned an interception for a touchdown, as he was stopped at the Raiders' 1-yard line. On the first play from scrimmage, a 1-yard touchdown run by running back Javonte Williams gave the Broncos a 13–7 lead at halftime. However, the Broncos were held scoreless in the second half, and the Raiders reclaimed the lead on the initial possession of the second half, with a 5-yard touchdown run by Jacobs. The Broncos' defense forced a fumble off of Carr on the Raiders' next possession; however, McManus missed wife left on a 55-yard field goal attempt with 19 seconds remaining in the third quarter. The Raiders added to their lead midway through the fourth quarter, with a 41-yard field goal by placekicker Daniel Carlson. On the Broncos' ensuing possession, tight end Albert Okwuegbunam dropped a critical pass from quarterback Drew Lock in Raiders' territory, on a 2nd-and-10. On the next play, Lock, who was playing in place of regular starter Teddy Bridgewater due to concussion protocols, was sacked for a 6-yard loss. With four minutes left in the game, the Broncos decided to punt; however, their offense never got the football back. After using all of their team timeouts, their defense was unable to stop the Raiders on a critical 3rd-and-2, in which Carr completed a 28-yard pass to tight end Foster Moreau for a game-clinching first down just before the two-minute warning. The Broncos' defense surrendered 160 rushing yards, and their 12 yards of rushing offense was tied for their third-fewest in franchise history.

==== Week 17: at Los Angeles Chargers ====
Week 17: Denver Broncos at Los Angeles Chargers – Game summary

| Quarter | 1 | 2 | 3 | 4 | Total |
|---|---|---|---|---|---|
| Broncos | 0 | 3 | 0 | 10 | **13** |
| **Chargers** | 7 | 10 | 3 | 14 | **34** |

at SoFi Stadium, Inglewood, California

- Date: January 2
- Game time: 2:05 p.m. MST/1:05 p.m. PST
- Game weather: None (retractable roof closed)
- Game attendance: 70,240
- Referee: Craig Wrolstad
- TV announcers (CBS): Ian Eagle, Charles Davis and Evan Washburn
- Recap, Game Book

Game information

**First quarter**

- LAC – Austin Ekeler 3-yard run (Dustin Hopkins kick), 11:49. Chargers 7–0. **Drive: 7 plays, 55 yards, 3:11.**

**Second quarter**

- LAC – Dustin Hopkins 19-yard field goal, 11:27. Chargers 10–0. **Drive: 14 plays, 69 yards, 6:45.**
- LAC – Keenan Allen 8-yard pass from Justin Herbert (Dustin Hopkins kick), 0:14. Chargers 17–0. **Drive: 11 plays, 49 yards, 3:00.**
- DEN – Brandon McManus 61-yard field goal, 0:00. Chargers 17–3. **Drive: 3 plays, 32 yards, 0:14.**

**Third quarter**

- LAC – Dustin Hopkins 23-yard field goal, 7:09. Chargers 20–3. **Drive: 14 plays, 78 yards, 5:41.**

**Fourth quarter**

- DEN – Brandon McManus 23-yard field goal, 14:53. Chargers 20–6. **Drive: 12 plays, 70 yards, 7:16.**
- LAC – Andre Roberts 101-yard kickoff return (Dustin Hopkins kick), 14:40. Chargers 27–6. **Drive: 0 plays, 0 yards, 0:13.**
- LAC – Mike Williams 45-yard pass from Justin Herbert (Dustin Hopkins kick), 10:18. Chargers 34–6. **Drive: 3 plays, 52 yards, 1:04.**
- DEN – Noah Fant 5-yard pass from Drew Lock (Brandon McManus kick), 6:31. Chargers 34–13. **Drive: 6 plays, 75 yards, 3:47.**

**Top passers**

- DEN – Drew Lock – 18/25, 245 yards, TD
- LAC – Justin Herbert – 22/31, 237 yards, 2 TD

**Top rushers**

- DEN – Melvin Gordon – 10 rushes, 43 yards
- LAC – Austin Ekeler – 17 rushes, 58 yards, TD

**Top receivers**

- DEN – Noah Fant – 6 receptions, 92 yards, TD
- LAC – Mike Williams – 3 receptions, 63 yards, TD

The Broncos' offensive struggles continued and they never recovered from a 17–0 deficit, in a 34–13 loss to the Chargers. The Broncos trailed 20–3 at the beginning of the fourth quarter, with hopes that a 1–yard touchdown run by running back Melvin Gordon would narrow the deficit. However, it was nullified by an illegal formation penalty, and the Broncos were forced to settle on a short 26-yard field goal by placekicker Brandon McManus, who kicked a 61-yarder just before halftime. Chargers' return specialist Andre Roberts returned the ensuing kickoff 101 yards for a touchdown, and the game was put out of reach, with Chargers' quarterback Justin Herbert's second touchdown pass of the game—a 45-yarder to wide receiver Mike Williams. The Broncos' only touchdown of the game occurred at the 6:35 mark of the fourth quarter, in which quarterback Drew Lock connected on a 5-yard pass to tight end Noah Fant, by which time the game had already been decided in the Chargers' favor. With the loss, the Broncos were officially eliminated from postseason contention. The Chargers win also mathematically eliminated the Miami Dolphins, who lost to the Tennessee Titans earlier that day, and the Cleveland Browns, who were scheduled to kick off Sunday Night Football later that evening on the road against the Pittsburgh Steelers.

==== Week 18: vs. Kansas City Chiefs ====
Week 18: Kansas City Chiefs at Denver Broncos – Game summary

| Quarter | 1 | 2 | 3 | 4 | Total |
|---|---|---|---|---|---|
| **Chiefs** | 7 | 3 | 7 | 11 | **28** |
| Broncos | 7 | 7 | 7 | 3 | **24** |

at Empower Field at Mile High, Denver, Colorado

- Date: January 8
- Game time: 2:30 p.m. MST
- Game weather: Cloudy, 44 °F (7 °C)
- Game attendance: 76,012
- Referee: Brad Rogers
- TV announcers (ESPN/ABC): Chris Fowler, Kirk Herbstreit, Laura Rutledge and John Parry
- Recap, Game Book

Game information

**First quarter**

- KC – Travis Kelce 3-yard pass from Patrick Mahomes (Harrison Butker kick), 6:08. Chiefs 7–0. **Drive: 17 plays, 91 yards, 7:49.**
- DEN – Drew Lock 5-yard run (Brandon McManus kick), 0:26. Tied 7–7. **Drive: 12 plays, 67 yards, 5:42.**

**Second quarter**

- DEN – Drew Lock 23-yard run (Brandon McManus kick), 7:49. Broncos 14–7. **Drive: 8 plays, 80 yards, 5:07.**
- KC – Harrison Butker 34-yard field goal, 2:18. Broncos 14–10. **Drive: 13 plays, 59 yards, 5:31.**

**Third quarter**

- KC – Jerick McKinnon 14-yard pass from Patrick Mahomes (Harrison Butker kick), 10:43. Chiefs 17–14. **Drive: 9 plays, 75 yards, 4:17.**
- DEN – Melvin Gordon 47-yard run (Brandon McManus kick), 9:02. Broncos 21–17. **Drive: 5 plays, 75 yards, 1:41.**

**Fourth quarter**

- KC – Harrison Butker 51-yard field goal, 14:44. Broncos 21–20. **Drive: 10 plays, 25 yards, 4:33.**
- KC – Nick Bolton 86-yard fumble return (Patrick Mahomes run), 7:42. Chiefs 28–21.
- DEN – Brandon McManus 31-yard field goal, 4:37. Chiefs 28–24. **Drive: 8 plays, 62 yards, 3:05.**

**Top passers**

- KC – Patrick Mahomes – 27/44, 270 yards, 2 TD
- DEN – Drew Lock – 12/24, 162 yards

**Top rushers**

- KC – Patrick Mahomes – 9 rushes, 54 yards
- DEN – Melvin Gordon – 12 rushes, 110 yards, TD

**Top receivers**

- KC – Mecole Hardman – 8 reception, 103 yards
- DEN – Tim Patrick – 6 receptions, 95 yards

The Broncos hosted the Chiefs in the 2021 regular season finale. The Chiefs took the early lead, with quarterback Patrick Mahomes connecting with tight end Travis Kelce on a 3-yard touchdown pass. The Broncos responded with two rushing touchdowns by quarterback Drew Lock—a 5-yard run late in the first quarter, followed by a 23-yard run midway through the second quarter. A 34-yard field goal by Chiefs' placekicker Harrison Butker narrowed the Broncos' lead to 14–10 just before the two-minute warning. The Chiefs took the lead on the initial possession of the second half, with Mahomes' second touchdown pass of the game—a 14-yarder to running back Jerick McKinnon. The Broncos responded, with a 47-yard touchdown run by running back Melvin Gordon. Butker's second field goal of the game—a 51-yarder at the beginning of the fourth quarter, narrowed the Broncos' lead to 21–20. The Broncos were attempting to add to their lead, and marched deep into Chiefs' territory, when Chiefs' linebacker Melvin Ingram penetrated into the Broncos' backfield untouched, and forced a fumble off of Gordon. Linebacker Nick Bolton scooped up the football, and returned the fumble 86 yards for a game-changing touchdown (coupled with Mahomes rushing for a successful two-point conversion). This gave the Chiefs a 28–21 lead midway through the fourth quarter. The Broncos reached the Chiefs' 13-yard line in eight plays on their next possession, and faced a 4th-and-9. However, instead of a potential game-tying touchdown, the Broncos settled for a 31-yard field goal by placekicker Brandon McManus with 4:41 remaining in the game. The Broncos' defense was unable to prevent the Chiefs from running out the clock, sealing their 13th consecutive loss to the Chiefs, dating back to 2015.

=== Standings ===
==== Division ====
AFC West
| | W | L | T | PCT | DIV | CONF | PF | PA | STK |
|---|---|---|---|---|---|---|---|---|---|
| ^{(2)} Kansas City Chiefs | 12 | 5 | 0 | .706 | 5–1 | 7–5 | 480 | 364 | W1 |
| ^{(5)} Las Vegas Raiders | 10 | 7 | 0 | .588 | 3–3 | 8–4 | 374 | 439 | W4 |
| Los Angeles Chargers | 9 | 8 | 0 | .529 | 3–3 | 6–6 | 474 | 459 | L1 |
| Denver Broncos | 7 | 10 | 0 | .412 | 1–5 | 3–9 | 335 | 322 | L4 |

==== Conference ====
AFC
| # | Team | Division | W | L | T | PCT | DIV | CONF | SOS | SOV | STK |
|---|---|---|---|---|---|---|---|---|---|---|---|
**Division winners**
| 1 (Note: Tennessee finished ahead of Kansas City based on head-to-head victory, claiming the No. 1 seed.) | Tennessee Titans | South | 12 | 5 | 0 | .706 | 5–1 | 8–4 | .472 | .480 | W3 |
| 2 | Kansas City Chiefs | West | 12 | 5 | 0 | .706 | 5–1 | 7–5 | .538 | .517 | W1 |
| 3 | Buffalo Bills | East | 11 | 6 | 0 | .647 | 5–1 | 7–5 | .472 | .428 | W4 |
| 4 | Cincinnati Bengals | North | 10 | 7 | 0 | .588 | 4–2 | 8–4 | .472 | .462 | L1 |
**Wild cards**
| 5 (Note: Las Vegas claimed the No. 5 seed over New England based on win percentage in common games (5–1 vs. 2–4 against: Miami, Dallas, LA Chargers, Cleveland, and Indianapolis).) | Las Vegas Raiders | West | 10 | 7 | 0 | .588 | 3–3 | 8–4 | .510 | .515 | W4 |
| 6 | New England Patriots | East | 10 | 7 | 0 | .588 | 3–3 | 8–4 | .481 | .394 | L1 |
| 7 | Pittsburgh Steelers | North | 9 | 7 | 1 | .559 | 4–2 | 7–5 | .521 | .490 | W2 |
**Did not qualify for the postseason**
| 8 (Note: Indianapolis finished ahead of Miami and Los Angeles based on conference record (7–5 vs. 6–6).) | Indianapolis Colts | South | 9 | 8 | 0 | .529 | 3–3 | 7–5 | .495 | .431 | L2 |
| 9 (Note: Miami finished ahead of LA Chargers based on win percentage in common games (5–1 vs. 2–4 against: New England, Las Vegas, Houston, Baltimore, and NY Giants).) | Miami Dolphins | East | 9 | 8 | 0 | .529 | 4–2 | 6–6 | .464 | .379 | W1 |
| 10 | Los Angeles Chargers | West | 9 | 8 | 0 | .529 | 3–3 | 6–6 | .510 | .500 | L1 |
| 11 (Note: Cleveland finished ahead of Baltimore based on division record (3–3 vs. 1–5).) | Cleveland Browns | North | 8 | 9 | 0 | .471 | 3–3 | 5–7 | .514 | .415 | W1 |
| 12 | Baltimore Ravens | North | 8 | 9 | 0 | .471 | 1–5 | 5–7 | .531 | .460 | L6 |
| 13 | Denver Broncos | West | 7 | 10 | 0 | .412 | 1–5 | 3–9 | .484 | .357 | L4 |
| 14 (Note: NY Jets finished ahead of Houston based on head-to-head victory.) | New York Jets | East | 4 | 13 | 0 | .235 | 0–6 | 4–8 | .512 | .426 | L2 |
| 15 | Houston Texans | South | 4 | 13 | 0 | .235 | 3–3 | 4–8 | .498 | .397 | L2 |
| 16 | Jacksonville Jaguars | South | 3 | 14 | 0 | .176 | 1–5 | 3–9 | .512 | .569 | W1 |
**Tiebreakers** (Note: When breaking ties for three or more teams under the NFL's rules, they are first broken within divisions, then comparing only the highest-ranked remaining team from each division.)

=== Statistics ===
==== Team leaders ====
| Category | Player(s) | Value |
|---|---|---|
| Passing yards | Teddy Bridgewater | 3,052 |
| Passing touchdowns | Teddy Bridgewater | 18 |
| Rushing yards | Melvin Gordon | 918 |
| Rushing touchdowns | Melvin Gordon | 8 |
| Receptions | Noah Fant | 68 |
| Receiving yards | Courtland Sutton | 776 |
| Receiving touchdowns | Tim Patrick | 5 |
| Points | Brandon McManus | 111 |
| Kickoff return yards | Diontae Spencer | 291 |
| Punt return yards | Diontae Spencer | 206 |
| Tackles | Kareem Jackson | 88 |
| Sacks | Shelby Harris | 6 |
| Forced fumbles | Malik Reed | 2 |
| Interceptions | Justin Simmons | 5 |

Source for this section: Denver Broncos' official website.

==== League rankings ====
Offense
| Category | Value | NFL rank (out of 32) |
|---|---|---|
| Total yards | 330.5 YPG | 19th |
| Yards per play | 5.4 | T–18th |
| Rushing yards | 119.1 YPG | 13th |
| Yards per rush | 4.5 | T–7th |
| Passing yards | 211.4 YPG | 19th |
| Yards per pass | 7.1 | 15th |
| Pass completions | 354/541 (.654) | 18th |
| Total touchdowns | 37 | T–21st |
| Rushing touchdowns | 16 | T–14th |
| Receiving touchdowns | 20 | T–25th |
| Scoring | 19.7 PPG | T–23rd |
| Red Zone Touchdowns | 29/53 (.547) | 22nd |
| Third down efficiency | 82/213 (.385) | 21st |
| Fourth down efficiency | 16/28 (.571) | 13th |
| First downs per game | 19.5 | T–20th |
| Fewest sacks allowed | 40 | T–19th |
| Fewest giveaways | 18 | T–6th |
| Fewest penalties | 83 | 6th |
| Least penalty yardage | 711 | 6th |

Defense
| Category | Value | NFL rank (out of 32) |
|---|---|---|
| Total yards | 326.1 YPG | 8th |
| Yards per play | 5.3 | T–11th |
| Rushing yards | 111.3 YPG | 15th |
| Yards per rush | 4.3 | T–13th |
| Passing yards | 214.8 YPG | 8th |
| Yards per pass | 6.9 | T–9th |
| Pass completions | 341/562 (.607) | 4th |
| Total touchdowns | 36 | 4th |
| Rushing touchdowns | 9 | T–1st |
| Receiving touchdowns | 22 | 5th |
| Scoring | 18.9 PPG | 3rd |
| Red Zone Touchdowns | 21/43 (.488) | 3rd |
| Third down efficiency | 101/225 (.449) | 28th |
| Fourth down efficiency | 11/26 (.423) | 4th |
| First downs per game | 18.4 | 5th |
| Sacks | 36 | T–18th |
| Takeaways | 19 | T–21st |
| Fewest penalties | 104 | T–21st |
| Least penalty yardage | 922 | 24th |

Special teams
| Category | Value | NFL rank (out of 32) |
|---|---|---|
| Gross punting | 46.0 YPP | 15th |
| Kickoffs | 63.8 YPK | 7th |
| Punt returns | 8.2 YPR | T–18th |
| Kick returns | 16.2 YPR | 32nd |
| Punt coverage | 6.4 YPR | 3rd |
| Kick coverage | 39.4 YPR | 32nd |

Source for this section: Pro-Football Reference.

== Awards and honors ==
| Recipient | Award(s) |
|---|---|
| Brandon McManus | Week 14: AFC Special Teams Player of the Week |
| Von Miller | September: AFC Defensive Player of the Month |
| Patrick Surtain II | Week 12: AFC Defensive Player of the Week and NFL Rookie of the Week |
| Javonte Williams | Week 9: NFL Rookie of the Week |

=== Pro Bowl and All-Pro selections ===
On January 14, 2022, safety Justin Simmons was voted to the 2021 All-Pro Team, and named to the Second Team. In addition, offensive tackle Garett Bolles and cornerback Patrick Surtain II were both named first alternates for the Pro Bowl.
