= Curtis Robinson =

American football player (born 1998)

No. 42 – Dallas Cowboys
- Position: Linebacker
- Roster status: Practice squad

Personal information
- Born: June 2, 1998 (age 28); Newport Beach, California, U.S.
- Listed height: 6 ft 3 in (1.91 m)
- Listed weight: 235 lb (107 kg)

Career information
- High school: Mater Dei (Santa Ana)
- College: Stanford (2016–2020)
- NFL draft: 2021: undrafted

Career history
- Denver Broncos (2021); San Francisco 49ers (2021–2025); Dallas Cowboys (2026–present)

Career NFL statistics as of 2025
- Total tackles: 52
- Pass deflections: 1
- Stats at Pro Football Reference

Curtis Robinson (born June 2, 1998) is an American professional football linebacker for the Dallas Cowboys of the National Football League (NFL). He played college football for the Stanford Cardinal.

== College career ==
Robinson was a member of the Stanford Cardinal for five seasons. He finished his collegiate career with 144 tackles, three sacks, two forced fumbles, and one fumble recovery with one interception and five passes broken up in 45 games played.

== Professional career ==
Pre-draft measurables
Height	Weight	Arm length	Hand span	Wingspan	40-yard dash	10-yard split	20-yard split	20-yard shuttle	Three-cone drill	Vertical jump	Broad jump	Bench press
6 ft 3 1/8 in (1.91 m)	236 lb (107 kg)	31 5/8 in (0.80 m)	10 in (0.25 m)	6 ft 5 1/2 in (1.97 m)	4.60 s	1.64 s	2.70 s	4.26 s	7.00 s	37.5 in (0.95 m)	9 ft 9 in (2.97 m)	22 reps
All values from Pro Day

=== Denver Broncos ===
Robinson signed with the Denver Broncos as an undrafted free agent on May 1, 2021, shortly after the conclusion of the 2021 NFL draft. He was waived by Denver during final roster cuts on August 31, but was re-signed to the team's practice squad the next day. Robinson was elevated to the active roster on October 2, for the team's Week 4 game against the Baltimore Ravens, and made his NFL debut in the game. Robinson was signed to the Broncos' active roster on October 19. He was waived on October 26, and re-signed to the practice squad. Robinson was released by the Broncos on November 30.

=== San Francisco 49ers ===
On December 6, 2021, Robinson was signed to the San Francisco 49ers' practice squad. In three games for San Francisco, he recorded one tackle. Robinson signed a reserve/future contract with the 49ers on February 2, 2022.

On August 31, 2022, Robinson was placed on injured reserve. He was activated on October 15. Robinson was waived by the 49ers on December 23 and re-signed to the practice squad. He made three appearances for the team, recording no stats. On January 31, 2023, Robinson signed a reserve/future contract with the 49ers.

On August 29, 2023, Robinson was waived by the 49ers and re-signed to the practice squad. Robinson made appearances in three games for the 49ers, logging three combined tackles while playing primarily on special teams. He signed a reserve/future contract with San Francisco on February 13, 2024.

Robinson played in three games for the 49ers in 2024, logging one total tackle. On September 27, 2024, it was announced that Robinson had suffered a torn ACL in practice, ending his season. On December 5, the team announced Robinson as their nominee for the Walter Payton NFL Man of the Year Award.

On March 12, 2025, Robinson was re-signed by the 49ers. He was released on August 26 as a part of final roster cuts, and was re-signed to the practice squad the following day. On September 13, Robinson was promoted to the active roster. On December 4, the team announced Robinson as their nominee for the Walter Payton NFL Man of the Year Award for the second year in a row. He made 14 appearances (including three starts) for San Francisco during the regular season, recording one pass deflection and a career-high 42 combined tackles.

=== Dallas Cowboys ===
On April 27, 2026, Robinson signed a one-year, $1.215 million contract with the Dallas Cowboys. On August 30, he was released by the Cowboys as a part of final roster cuts; he was re–signed to the team's practice squad the next day.

== NFL career statistics ==
Legend
**Bold**	Career high

=== Regular season ===
Year	Team	Games		Tackles					Interceptions						Fumbles				
Year	Team	GP	GS	Cmb	Solo	Ast	Sck	TFL	Int	Yds	Avg	Lng	TD	PD	FF	Fum	FR	Yds	TD
2021	DEN	3	0	5	2	3	0.0	0	0	0	0.0	0	0	0	0	0	0	0	0
2021	SF	3	0	1	1	0	0.0	0	0	0	0.0	0	0	0	0	0	0	0	0
2022	SF	3	0	0	0	0	0.0	0	0	0	0.0	0	0	0	0	0	0	0	0
2023	SF	3	0	3	3	0	0.0	0	0	0	0.0	0	0	0	0	0	0	0	0
2024	SF	3	0	1	1	0	0.0	0	0	0	0.0	0	0	0	0	0	0	0	0
2025	SF	**14**	**3**	**42**	**19**	**23**	0.0	**1**	0	0	0.0	0	0	**1**	0	0	0	0	0
Career		29	3	52	26	26	0.0	1	0	0	0.0	0	0	1	0	0	0	0	0

=== Postseason ===
Year	Team	Games		Tackles					Interceptions						Fumbles				
Year	Team	GP	GS	Cmb	Solo	Ast	Sck	TFL	Int	Yds	Avg	Lng	TD	PD	FF	Fum	FR	Yds	TD
2025	SF	2	1	2	0	2	0.0	0	0	0	0.0	0	0	0	0	0	0	0	0
Career		2	1	2	0	2	0.0	0	0	0	0.0	0	0	0	0	0	0	0	0
