= Johnny Stanton =

American football player (born 1994)

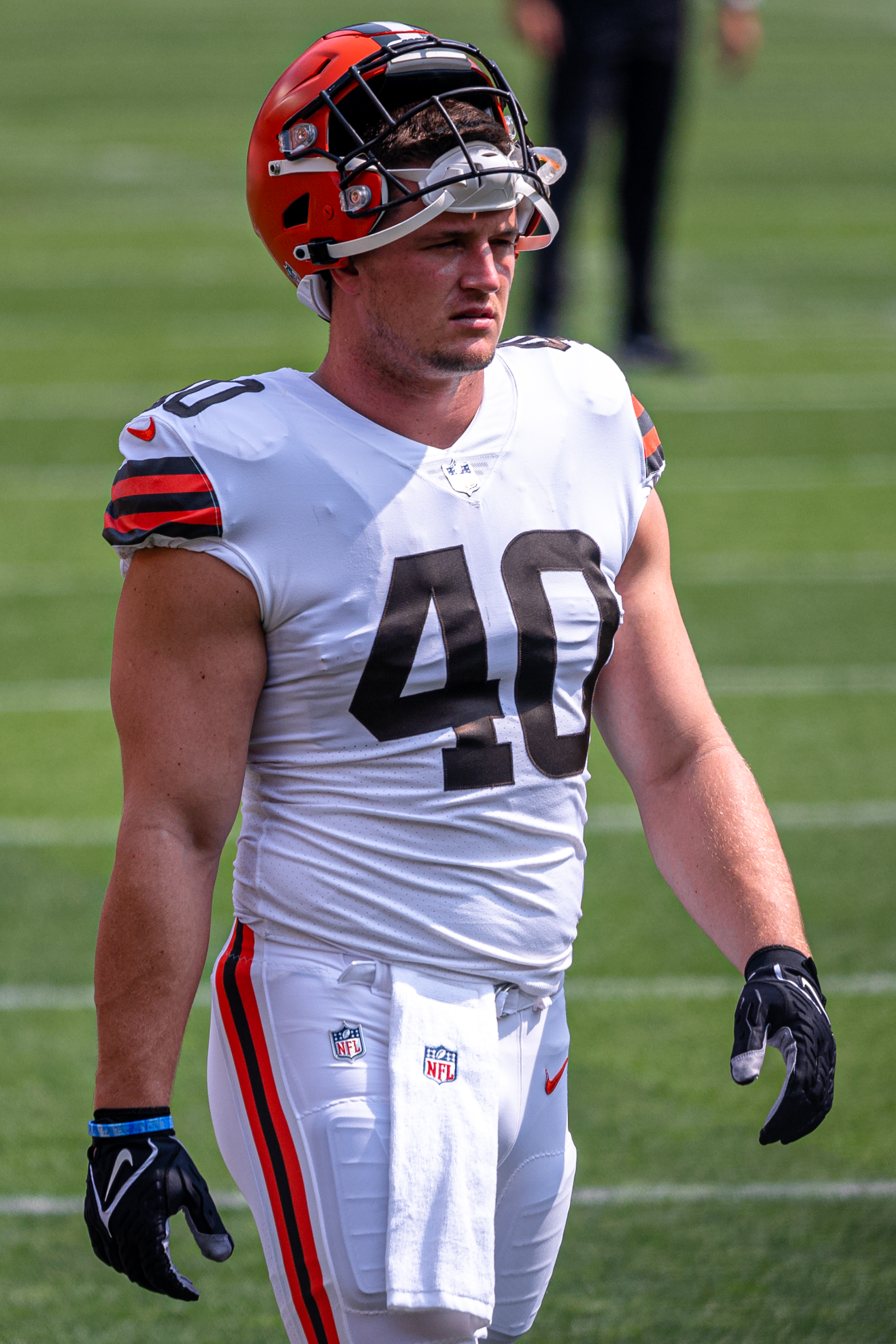
- Stanton with the Cleveland Browns in 2021

No. 40, 43
- Position: Fullback

Personal information
- Born: September 7, 1994 (age 32); Rancho Santa Margarita, California, U.S.
- Listed height: 6 ft 2 in (1.88 m)
- Listed weight: 240 lb (109 kg)

Career information
- High school: Santa Margarita Catholic (Rancho Santa Margarita)
- College: Nebraska (2013–2014); Saddleback (2015); UNLV (2016–2017)
- NFL draft: 2018: undrafted

Career history
- Minnesota Vikings (2018–2019); Los Angeles Wildcats (2020)*; Cleveland Browns (2020–2021)
- * Offseason or practice squad member only

Career NFL statistics
- Rushing attempts: 3
- Rushing yards: 5
- Receptions: 2
- Receiving yards: 7
- Receiving touchdowns: 1
- Stats at Pro Football Reference

Johnny Richard Stanton IV (born September 7, 1994) is an American former professional football player who was a fullback in the National Football League (NFL). He played college football for the UNLV Rebels. He signed with the Minnesota Vikings as an undrafted free agent in 2018, and also played in the NFL for the Cleveland Browns.

== Early life ==
Stanton grew up in Rancho Santa Margarita, California, and attended Santa Margarita Catholic High School. As a junior, he passed for 2,439 yards with 13 touchdowns and rushed for 1,428 yards and 21 touchdowns and was named first-team All-Area by the Los Angeles Times. Stanton completed 59 of 88 passes for 949 yards with 11 touchdowns while rushing for 386 yards and eight touchdowns on 47 carries before he suffered a season ending knee injury five games into his senior year.

== College career ==
Stanton began his collegiate career at Nebraska, redshirting his true freshman season. He spent his redshirt freshman season as the third-string quarterback, attempting one pass which was completed for six yards. Stanton left Nebraska at the end of the school year and transferred to Saddleback College for the 2015 season. In his only season with the Gauchos, Stanton completed 293-of-465 passes for 3,471 yards and 27 touchdowns and also led the team in rushing with 747 yards and 12 touchdowns. Stanton led the Gauchos to the 2015 SCFA Championship and onto the JUCO National Championship game against City College of San Francisco He committed to transfer to UNLV for his final two seasons of eligibility over offers from Oregon, Washington and Wisconsin.

Stanton was named the Rebels' starting quarterback going into his first season with the team and completed 50-of-107 passes for 676 yards, six touchdowns and six interceptions while also rushing 231 yards and a touchdown. He suffered a season-ending injury in the fourth game of the season. As a redshirt senior, he played fullback as well as on defense and special teams and also started three games at quarterback. Stanton finished the season with 724 passing yards with four touchdown passes and two interceptions while also rushing for 96 yards and two touchdowns and recorded nine tackles on defense and blocked a punt and returned one punt for 19 yards on special teams.

== Professional career ==
Pre-draft measurables
Height	Weight	Arm length	Hand span	40-yard dash	10-yard split	20-yard split	20-yard shuttle	Three-cone drill	Vertical jump	Broad jump	Bench press
6 ft 2 3/8 in (1.89 m)	240 lb (109 kg)	30 1/4 in (0.77 m)	10 1/4 in (0.26 m)	4.75 s	1.65 s	2.71 s	4.29 s	7.18 s	37.0 in (0.94 m)	10 ft 1 in (3.07 m)	31 reps
All values from Pro Day

=== Minnesota Vikings ===
Stanton was signed by the Minnesota Vikings as an undrafted free agent on May 7, 2018, after participating in a rookie minicamp with the team. He was placed on season-ending injured reserve on August 21, 2018, where he stayed until he was waived on January 25, 2019. He was re-signed by the Vikings to their practice squad on November 26, 2019. Stanton was released on December 10, 2019.

=== Los Angeles Wildcats ===
On December 17, 2019, Stanton signed with the Los Angeles Wildcats. He was waived on January 22, 2020.

=== Cleveland Browns ===
Stanton signed a reserve/futures contract with the Cleveland Browns on January 28, 2020. He was waived at the end of training camp on September 5, 2020, and re-signed to the team's practice squad the next day. Stanton was elevated to the active roster on November 21 for the team's week 11 game against the Philadelphia Eagles, and reverted to the practice squad after the game.

Stanton was signed to a reserve/futures contract by the Browns on January 18, 2021. Stanton was waived by the Browns on August 31, 2021. Stanton was re-signed to the Browns' practice squad on September 1, 2021. Stanton was signed to the Browns' active roster on October 12, 2021. In Week 7 against the Denver Broncos, Stanton scored the first touchdown of his NFL career on a 1-yard pass from Case Keenum in the Browns' 17–14 win. He was released on November 2, and re-signed to the practice squad on November 4. Stanton was elevated to the Browns' active roster on November 13, 2021. The Browns signed Stanton to a reserve/futures contract on January 10, 2022. Stanton was waived by the Browns on August 30, 2022.

== Post-NFL career ==
Since 2024, Stanton has co-hosted a podcast, Athletics Check, with Travis Reaves, discussing "sports and nerdy stuff". He has also appeared on Game Changer in the season 7 episode "Fool's Gold".
