= Barrington Wade =

American football player (born 1998)

Profile
- Position: Linebacker

Personal information
- Born: March 16, 1998 (age 28); Skokie, Illinois, U.S.
- Listed height: 6 ft 1 in (1.85 m)
- Listed weight: 232 lb (105 kg)

Career information
- High school: Niles North (Skokie)
- College: Iowa
- NFL draft: 2021: undrafted

Career history
- Baltimore Ravens (2021)*; Denver Broncos (2021); Winnipeg Blue Bombers (2023)*; Chicago Bears (2023)*; Montreal Alouettes (2025)*
- * Offseason or practice squad member only

Career NFL statistics
- Tackles: 1
- Stats at Pro Football Reference

Barrington Wade (born March 16, 1998) is an American former professional football player who was a linebacker for the Denver Broncos of the National Football League (NFL). He played college football for the Iowa Hawkeyes.

== College career ==
Wade was a member of the Iowa Hawkeyes for five seasons, redshirting as a true freshman. He finished his collegiate career with 23 tackles, one sack, 1.5 tackles for loss and two interceptions in 33 games played.

== Professional career ==
=== Baltimore Ravens ===
Wade signed with the Baltimore Ravens as an undrafted free agent on May 13, 2021. He was waived on August 6, 2021.

=== Denver Broncos ===
Wade was claimed off waivers by the Denver Broncos on August 7, 2021. He was waived during final roster cuts on August 31, 2021, but was signed to the team's practice squad the next day. Wade as signed to the Broncos' active roster on October 19, 2021. He was waived on October 25, and re-signed to the practice squad. He signed a reserve/future contract with the Broncos on January 10, 2022. He was waived on August 27, 2022.

=== Winnipeg Blue Bombers ===
On May 5, 2023, Wade signed with the Winnipeg Blue Bombers of the Canadian Football League (CFL). On June 3, 2023, Wade was released by the Blue Bombers.

=== Chicago Bears ===
On August 8, 2023, Wade signed with the Chicago Bears. He was waived on August 29, 2023.

=== Montreal Alouettes ===
Wade signed a futures contract with the Montreal Alouettes on September 11, 2024. He retired on April 11, 2025.
