= Quinn Bailey =

American football player (born 1995)

Profile
- Position: Offensive tackle

Personal information
- Born: October 18, 1995 (age 31); Lacey, Washington, U.S.
- Listed height: 6 ft 6 in (1.98 m)
- Listed weight: 323 lb (147 kg)

Career information
- High school: Higley (Gilbert, Arizona)
- College: Arizona State (2014–2018)
- NFL draft: 2019: undrafted

Career history
- Denver Broncos (2019–2024)

Career NFL statistics as of 2024
- Games played: 21
- Games started: 1
- Stats at Pro Football Reference

Quinn Russell Bailey (born October 18, 1995) is an American professional football offensive tackle. He was signed by the Denver Broncos as an undrafted free agent in 2019 following his college football career for the Arizona State Sun Devils.

== Professional career ==
Pre-draft measurables
Height	Weight	Arm length	Hand span	40-yard dash	10-yard split	20-yard split	20-yard shuttle	Three-cone drill	Vertical jump	Broad jump	Bench press
6 ft 4 5/8 in (1.95 m)	331 lb (150 kg)	32 3/4 in (0.83 m)	9 3/8 in (0.24 m)	5.41 s	1.88 s	3.08 s	4.75 s	8.23 s	28.0 in (0.71 m)	8 ft 8 in (2.64 m)	26 reps
All values from Pro Day

Bailey signed with the Denver Broncos as an undrafted free agent following the 2019 NFL draft on April 30, 2019. He was waived during final roster cuts on August 31, 2019, and signed to the team's practice squad the next day. He was promoted to the active roster on December 24, 2019.

The next season, Bailey was again waived during final roster cuts on September 5, 2020, and re-signed to the practice squad the next day. He was elevated to the active roster on November 14 for the team's week 10 game against the Las Vegas Raiders, and reverted to the practice squad after the game. He signed a reserve/future contract on January 4, 2021.

On August 31, 2021, Bailey was waived by the Broncos and re-signed to the practice squad the next day. He was promoted to the active roster on January 7, 2022.

On August 30, 2022, Bailey was waived by the Broncos and signed to the practice squad the next day. He was promoted to the active roster on November 19.

On August 1, 2024, Bailey was placed on injured reserve with an ankle injury, missing the entire 2024 season. After the end of the season, he became a free agent.
