= Rojesterman Farris =

American football player (born 1997)

No. 4
- Position: Cornerback

Personal information
- Born: September 11, 1997 (age 29); Saginaw, Michigan, U.S.
- Listed height: 5 ft 11 in (1.80 m)
- Listed weight: 179 lb (81 kg)

Career information
- High school: Coral Springs (Coral Springs, Florida)
- College: Hawaii (2015–2019)
- NFL draft: 2020: undrafted

Career history
- Atlanta Falcons (2020)*; Chicago Bears (2021)*; Denver Broncos (2021)*; Green Bay Packers (2021)*; Denver Broncos (2021); Seattle Sea Dragons (2023)
- * Offseason or practice squad member only

Career NFL statistics
- Games played: 1
- Stats at Pro Football Reference

Rojesterman Farris II (born September 11, 1997) is an American former professional football player who was a cornerback in the National Football League (NFL). He played college football for the Hawaii Rainbow Warriors and was signed by the Atlanta Falcons as an undrafted free agent in 2021. Farris has also spent time with the Chicago Bears, Green Bay Packers, and Denver Broncos.

== Early life and education ==
Farris was born on September 11, 1997, in Saginaw, Michigan. He attended Coral Springs Charter School in Florida, playing four seasons as a defensive back and wide receiver. As a senior, Farris recorded 32 tackles, two interceptions, and two fumble recoveries on defense, while making six catches for 153 yards and three touchdowns on offense.

Farris was listed in the Miami Herald top 150 recruits, and committed to the University of Hawaii. He spent his true freshman year of 2015 as a redshirt. As a freshman in 2016, he appeared in all 14 games at cornerback and was a starter in six games. He made 29 total tackles, 20 solo, and made his first career interception against San Diego State. As a sophomore the following year, he started in all but one game, missing their matchup against Wyoming. He totaled 43 tackles, and made one interception on the year. Farris scored his first career points against San Jose State, returning a blocked extra point for a defensive conversion. In every game he played in, Farris made at least three tackles.

In 2018, Farris was named honorable mention all-Mountain West after appearing in all 14 games, 13 as a starter, and leading the team with 11 pass breakups. He also made a total of 45 tackles, 35 solo. As a senior in 2019, he was named honorable mention all-Mountain West for the second consecutive year after making 54 tackles, sixth on the team. He was named the team's defensive MVP, and returned one interception 100 yards for a touchdown against Army. Farris later competed in the 2020 NFLPA Collegiate Bowl.

== Professional career ==
=== Atlanta Falcons ===
After going unselected in the 2020 NFL draft, Farris was signed by the Atlanta Falcons as an undrafted free agent. He was waived on August 4.

=== Chicago Bears ===
Farris was signed as a free agent by the Chicago Bears on May 14, 2021. He was waived on July 28.

=== Denver Broncos ===
On August 1, 2021, Farris signed with the Denver Broncos. He was waived on August 17.

=== Green Bay Packers ===
On August 27, 2021, Farris signed with the Green Bay Packers, only to be released four days later.

=== Denver Broncos (second stint) ===
Farris was signed again by the Denver Broncos to the practice squad on September 14, only to be released on October 5. He was re-signed to the practice squad on October 13. He was re-released on November 2, but was signed again on December 31. Farris was activated on January 1, 2021, prior to their game against the Los Angeles Chargers, and made his NFL debut in the game.

=== Seattle Sea Dragons ===
Farris was selected in the eighth round of the 2023 XFL draft during the defensive backs phase by the Seattle Sea Dragons. The Sea Dragons folded when the XFL and USFL merged to create the United Football League (UFL).
