= Calvin Anderson =

American football player (born 1996)

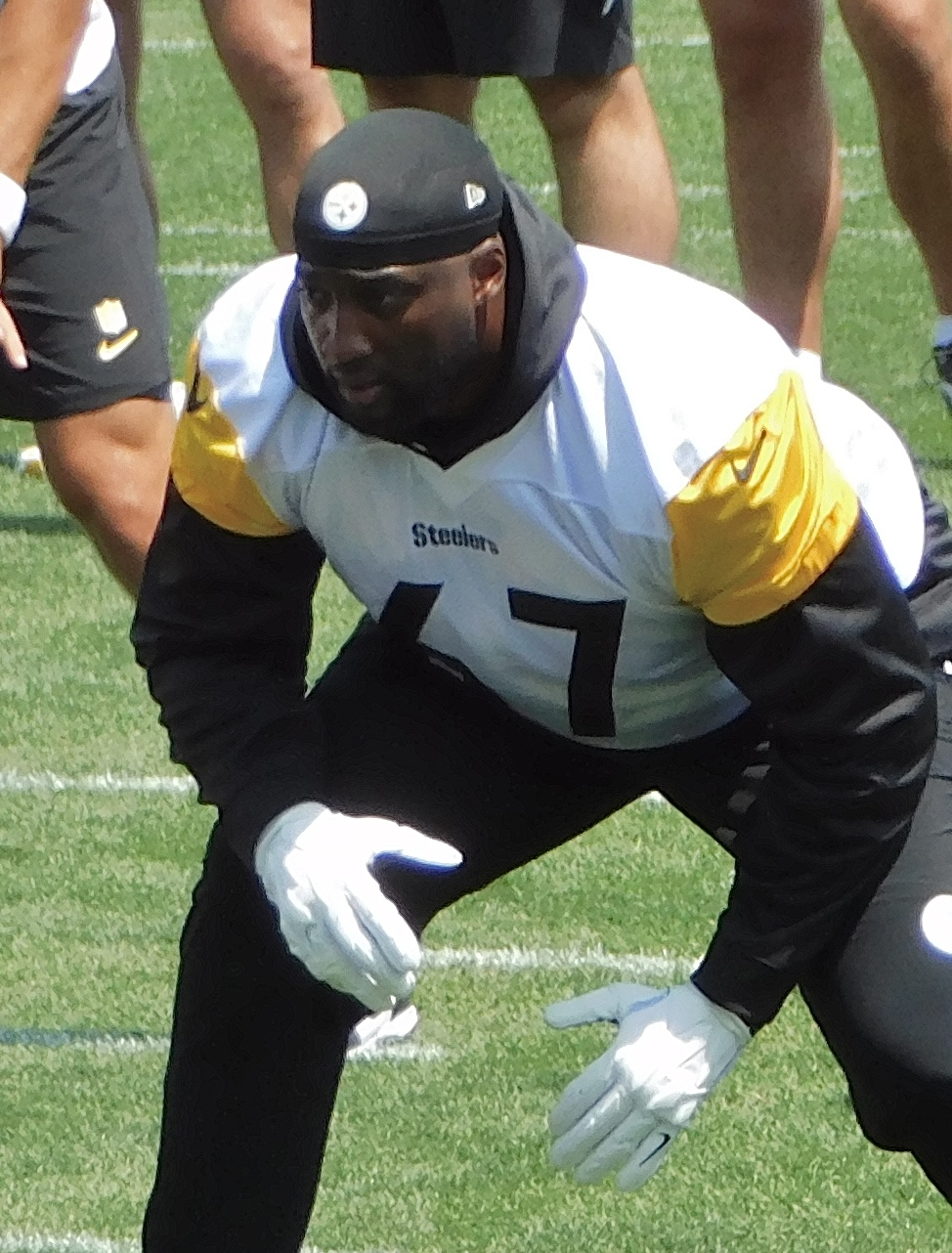
- Anderson with the Pittsburgh Steelers in 2025

Profile
- Position: Offensive tackle

Personal information
- Born: March 25, 1996 (age 30); Philadelphia, Pennsylvania, U.S.
- Listed height: 6 ft 5 in (1.96 m)
- Listed weight: 300 lb (136 kg)

Career information
- High school: Westlake (Austin, Texas)
- College: Rice (2014–2017); Texas (2018)
- NFL draft: 2019: undrafted

Career history
- New England Patriots (2019)*; New York Jets (2019)*; Denver Broncos (2019–2022); New England Patriots (2023); Pittsburgh Steelers (2024–2025)
- * Offseason or practice squad member only

Career NFL statistics as of 2025
- Games played: 59
- Games started: 14
- Stats at Pro Football Reference

Calvin Lee Anderson (born March 25, 1996) is an American professional football offensive tackle. He played college football for the Rice Owls and as a graduate transfer one season for the Texas Longhorns.

== Early life ==
Anderson attended Georgetown High School for the first three seasons of his high school career, before transferring to Westlake High School for his senior season. A undersized lineman for most of his high school career, he committed to Rice as a junior and remained committed to them despite offers from Power 5 schools Texas Tech and Kansas State.

== College career ==
After redshirting his freshman year, Anderson was a three-year starter at Rice where he started in 36 consecutive games for the Owls. He also garnered Conference USA All-Conference Honorable Mentions in 2016 and 2017. After narrowing his graduate transfer choices down to Michigan, Texas, Oklahoma, and Auburn, Anderson announced that he would transfer to Texas for the 2018 season.

== Professional career ==
Pre-draft measurables
Height	Weight	Arm length	Hand span	40-yard dash	10-yard split	20-yard split	20-yard shuttle	Three-cone drill	Vertical jump	Broad jump	Bench press
6 ft 4 1/2 in (1.94 m)	292 lb (132 kg)	33 1/8 in (0.84 m)	9 3/8 in (0.24 m)	5.31 s	1.77 s	3.00 s	4.45 s	7.20 s	31.0 in (0.79 m)	9 ft 4 in (2.84 m)	30 reps
All values from Pro Day

=== New England Patriots (first stint) ===
After going undrafted in the 2019 NFL draft, Anderson signed with the New England Patriots.

=== New York Jets ===
Anderson was waived by the Patriots on May 13, 2019, and claimed by the New York Jets. He was waived by the Jets at the end of the preseason and, after being coveted by a few teams, was added to the Jets practice squad and paid elevated practice squad salary for the first 4 weeks of the regular season.

=== Denver Broncos ===
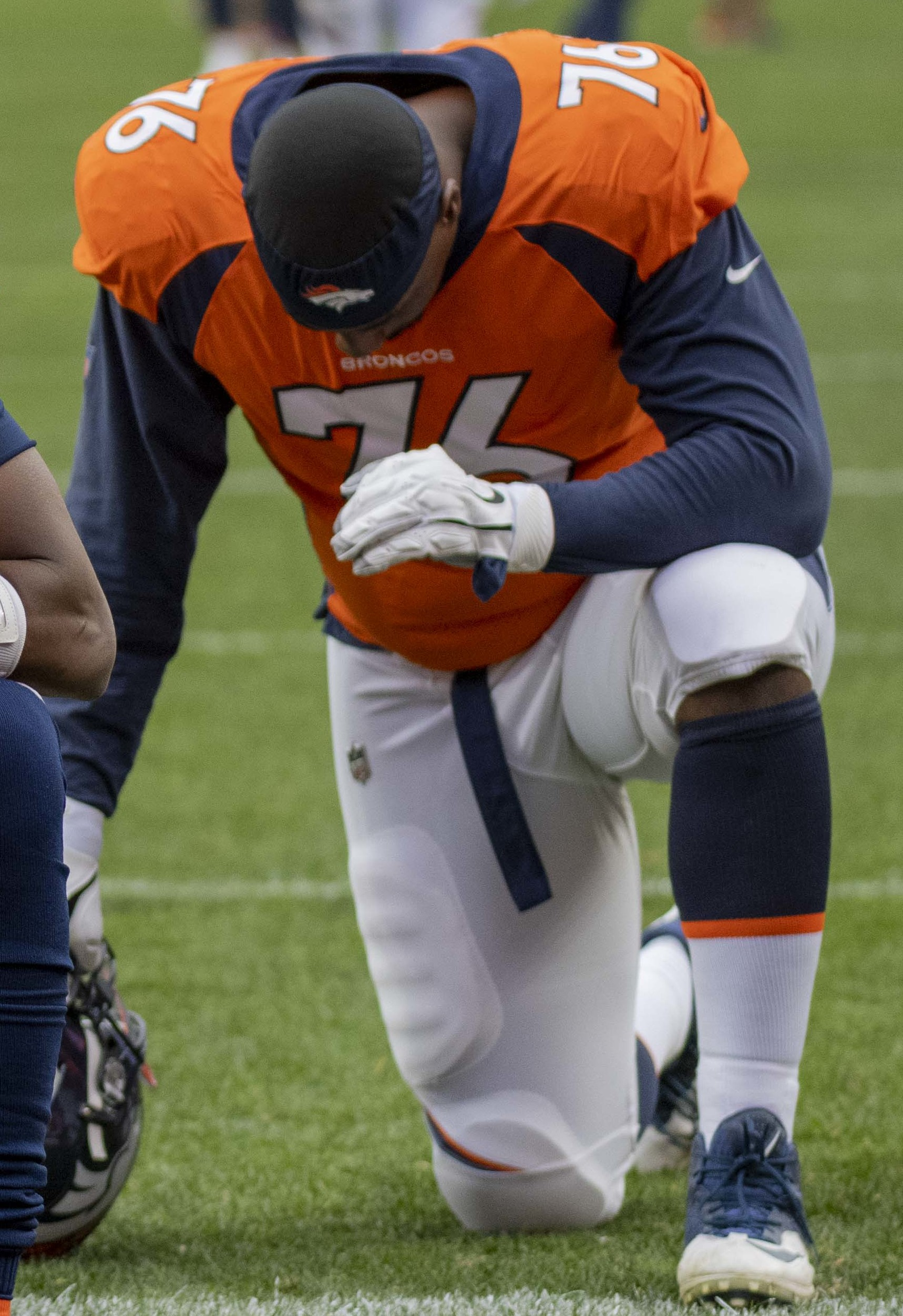
Anderson with the Broncos in 2021

Anderson was signed by the Denver Broncos from the New York Jets' practice squad on October 1, 2019.

Anderson got his first regular season NFL start during the 2020 season at right tackle in a week 10 game vs the Las Vegas Raiders. During a week 14 matchup with the Broncos and the Carolina Panthers, Anderson garnered attention after having to replace starting left tackle Garett Bolles half an hour prior to the start of the game due to illness.

The Broncos placed an exclusive-rights free agent tender on Anderson on March 16, 2021. He signed the one-year contract on May 17. He entered the 2021 season as the primary swing tackle for the Broncos. He started three games in the middle of the season.

On March 14, 2022, Anderson signed a one-year $2.5m dollar fully guaranteed contract extension with the Broncos. Anderson started 7 games in 2022 season for Denver, all of which came at left tackle. Anderson also started all pre-season games.

=== New England Patriots (second stint) ===
On March 16, 2023, Anderson signed a two-year contract with the Patriots. He spent much of 2023 training camp on the non-football injury list; in April 2024 Anderson revealed it was because he had contracted malaria while doing philanthropic work in Nigeria. He was placed on injured reserve on November 3, 2023, after suffering a heart contusion in practice.

On August 27, 2024, Anderson was placed on injured reserve and released a few days later.

=== Pittsburgh Steelers ===
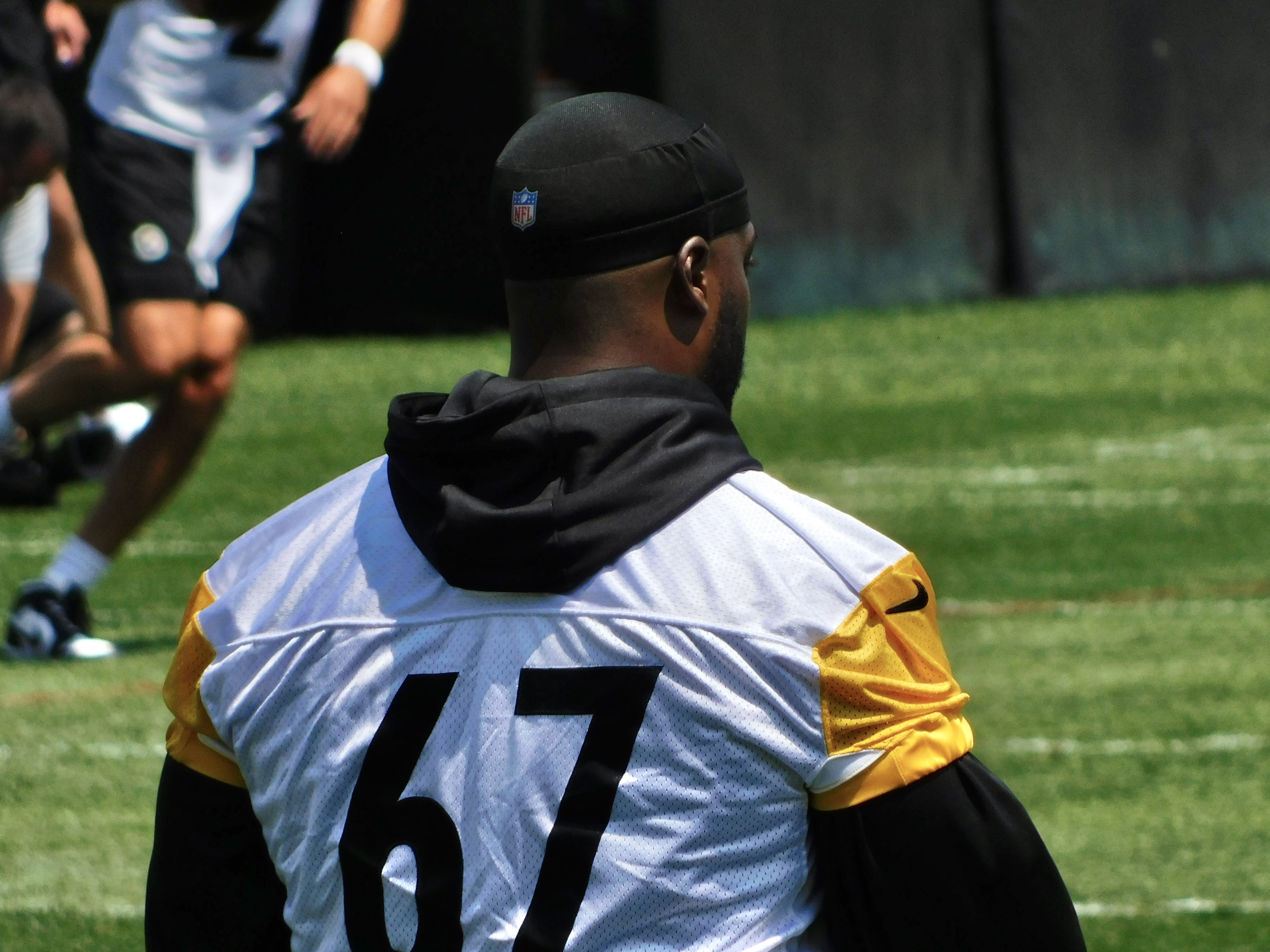
Anderson with the Pittsburgh Steelers in 2025

On September 24, 2024, Anderson signed with the Pittsburgh Steelers. He finished his first season in Pittsburgh playing in 10 games with no starts. He and the Steelers ended the season with a 28-14 loss to the Baltimore Ravens in the AFC Wild Card round on January 11, 2025.

On April 7, 2025, Anderson signed a two-year contract extension with the Steelers. He made nine appearances for Pittsburgh during the year, playing primarily as a reserve tackle. On December 10, Anderson was placed on injured reserve due to a knee injury. He was released on March 2, 2026.

== Personal life ==
Anderson was born in Philadelphia and raised in Austin Texas. Anderson's father played college football at Army and was a military flight surgeon who also obtained a Master of Business Administration, became an ordained minister, and served as a physician before retiring as a full-bird colonel in 2019. Anderson himself has gained notoriety for having the ability to solve a Rubik's Cube in different ways, such as behind his back or blindfolded. In his rookie season in the NFL Anderson was named a brand ambassador for Rubik's Cube by the company, representing the company at international events in the offseason. Calvin became the first professional athlete in history to be a brand ambassador for Rubik’s Cube. A mathematical economic analysis major while at Rice University, Anderson once made a PowerPoint presentation for his parents to get them to invest in Nintendo prior to the revolutionary creation of the first 3D gaming app Pokémon Go. During the 2022 offseason Anderson enrolled in and completed a graduate course at Harvard Business School.

Anderson is in a long term relationship with Dutch/Nigerian model, lawyer and real estate investor Sherée Olaiya Lanihun from Amsterdam. Sherée obtained a Bachelor of Laws from The University of Amsterdam, a Master of Laws from Erasmus University, and a Master of Business from Cambridge University in the UK.

Advocacy Work

In 2023, while traveling in Nigeria, Anderson contracted a near-fatal case of malaria, which resulted in severe weight loss and forced him to miss the New England Patriots' preseason. He became the first active NFL player to survive the disease and successfully return to professional football.

Following his recovery, Anderson partnered with the United Nations Foundation's "United to Beat Malaria" campaign as a global health advocate. In this role, he has led public awareness campaigns regarding preventable vector-borne diseases and traveled to Capitol Hill to meet with members of Congress to lobby for sustained, bipartisan U.S. funding for global health initiatives. In June 2026, Anderson was honored with the Clio Health Impact Award in recognition of his advocacy work and impact on global health awareness.
