= Andre Mintze =

American football player (born 1998)

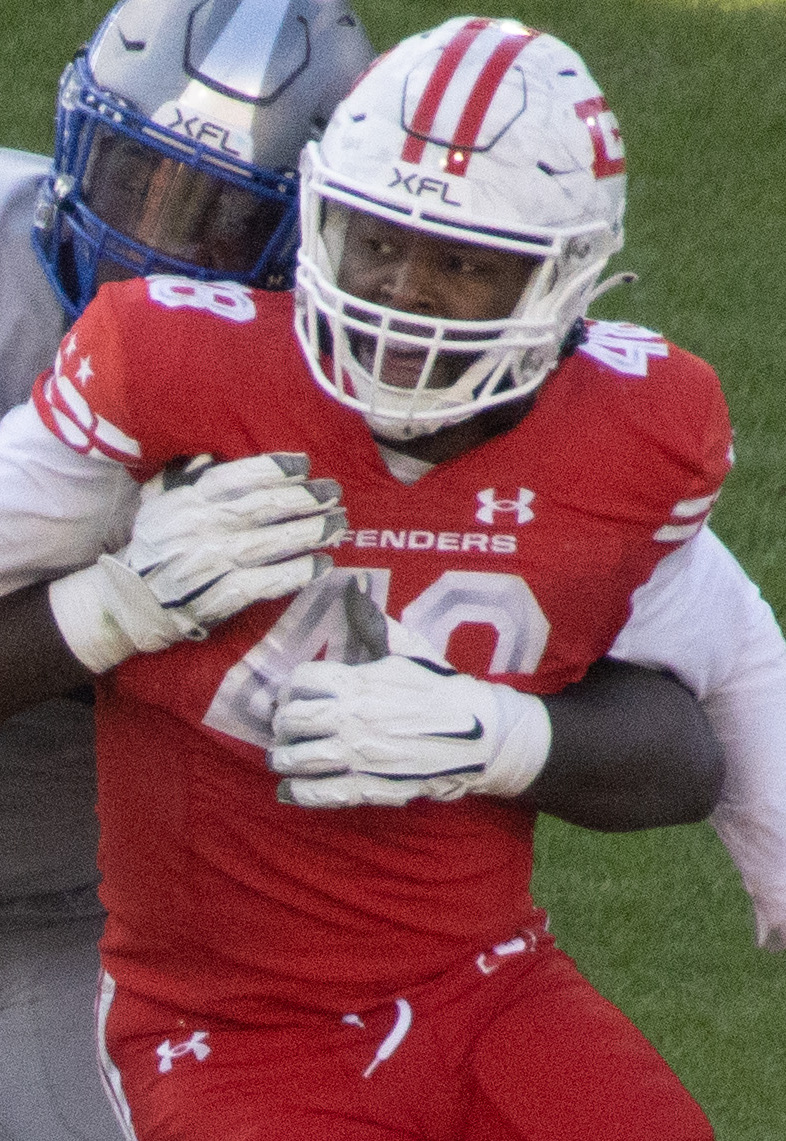
- Mintze with the DC Defenders in 2023

No. 48
- Position: Linebacker

Personal information
- Born: September 10, 1998 (age 28); Philadelphia, Pennsylvania, U.S.
- Listed height: 6 ft 3 in (1.91 m)
- Listed weight: 249 lb (113 kg)

Career information
- High school: Imhotep Charter (Philadelphia)
- College: Vanderbilt
- NFL draft: 2021: undrafted

Career history
- Denver Broncos (2021); Minnesota Vikings (2022)*; DC Defenders (2023–2026)
- * Offseason or practice squad member only

Awards and highlights
- UFL champion (2025)

Career NFL statistics
- Total tackles: 4

Andre Mintze (born September 10, 1998) is an American former professional football player who was a linebacker in the National Football League (NFL). He played college football for the Vanderbilt Commodores and was signed by the Denver Broncos as an undrafted free agent in 2021. He also played for the DC Defenders of the United Football League (UFL).

== College career ==
Mintze was a member of the Vanderbilt Commodores for five seasons, redshirting his true freshman season. He finished his collegiate career with 75 tackles, 17 tackles for loss, and 8.5 sacks with three forced fumbles and one fumble recovery in 43 games played.

== Professional career ==
Pre-draft measurables
Height	Weight	Arm length	Hand span	Wingspan	40-yard dash	10-yard split	20-yard split	Broad jump	Bench press
6 ft 2 5/8 in (1.90 m)	253 lb (115 kg)	32 3/4 in (0.83 m)	9 7/8 in (0.25 m)	6 ft 6 1/2 in (1.99 m)	4.59 s	1.52 s	2.66 s	9 ft 11 in (3.02 m)	18 reps
All values from Pro Day

=== Denver Broncos ===
Mintze signed with the Denver Broncos as an undrafted free agent on May 1, 2021, shortly after the conclusion of the 2021 NFL draft. He made the Broncos' 53-man roster out of training camp. Mintze was placed on injured reserve on October 19, with a hamstring injury. He was activated on January 1, 2022. Mintze was waived by the Broncos on May 12.

=== Minnesota Vikings ===
Mintze signed with the Minnesota Vikings on June 13, 2022. He was released by the Vikings on August 16.

=== DC Defenders ===
On November 17, 2022, Mintze was selected by the DC Defenders of the XFL. He re-signed with the team on February 8, 2024, and again on October 16.

On June 1, 2026, Mintze came out of retirement and re-signed with the Defenders.
