= 2023 Denver Broncos season =

American football team season

- Owner: Rob Walton (Note: Other members of the ownership group include Carrie Walton Penner, Greg Penner, Mellody Hobson, Condoleezza Rice, and Lewis Hamilton)
- General manager: George Paton
- Head coach: Sean Payton
- Offensive coordinator: Joe Lombardi
- Defensive coordinator: Vance Joseph
- Home stadium: Empower Field at Mile High

Results
- Record: 8–9
- Division place: 3rd AFC West
- Playoffs: Did not qualify
- All-Pros: KR Marvin Mims (2nd team); S Justin Simmons (2nd team)
- Pro Bowlers: RS Marvin Mims; FS Justin Simmons; CB Patrick Surtain II

Uniform
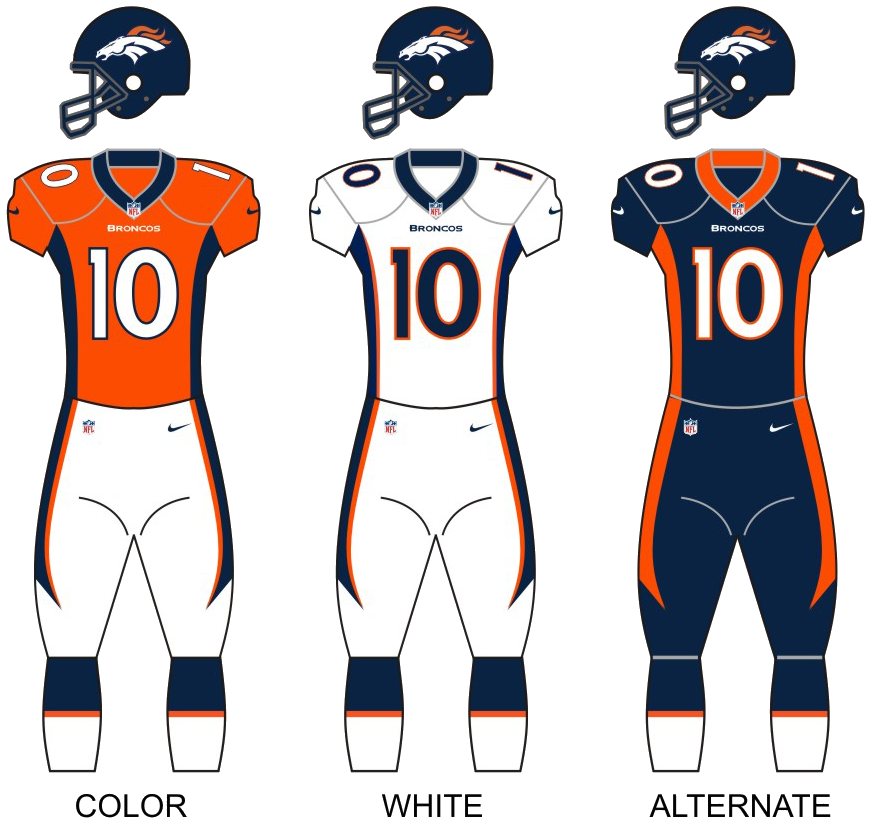

The 2023 season was the Denver Broncos' 54th season in the National Football League (NFL) and their 64th overall. It was also their third under the leadership of general manager George Paton, their second under the ownership of the Walton-Penner family group and their first under head coach Sean Payton. During the off-season, the Broncos released longtime kicker Brandon McManus after spending nine seasons with the team. He was the last player from the 2015 Super Bowl 50-winning team still on the roster. His release made safety Justin Simmons, who has been with the team since 2016, the team's new longest-tenured player.

After a dismal 1–5 start, the team's first since 1994, the Broncos started to surge, winning five straight for the first time since 2015 to improve upon their 5–12 record from the previous season. However, the Broncos won just two of their final six games, suffering their seventh consecutive losing season and missed the playoffs for an eighth consecutive season. This was the first time the Broncos ranked bottom 10 on offense and defense since the 1992 season. After his worst statistical season in 2022, quarterback Russell Wilson improved his performance, but was benched for the team's final two games for financial reasons and was subsequently released the following offseason where he joined the Pittsburgh Steelers.

One of the Broncos' highlights of the season was their Week 8 win of 24–9 over division rival, defending Super Bowl champion and eventual-repeat champion Kansas City Chiefs. This win snapped a 16-game losing streak by the Broncos against the Chiefs, and their first win against quarterback Patrick Mahomes. Meanwhile, one of the team's lowlights was a 70–20 loss in Week 3 to the Miami Dolphins, which became the most infamous game of the Broncos' season.

The Denver Broncos drew an average home attendance of 76,388 in 9 home games in the 2023 NFL season, the 5th highest in the league.

== Coaching changes ==
On February 3, Sean Payton was named as the 20th head coach in franchise history. Payton previously coached the New Orleans Saints from 2006 to 2021, with the exception of 2012, and the Broncos agreed to draft compensation with the Saints—see Draft section. Payton was the Broncos' seventh different head coach since 2008, and their third since 2018. He replaced Nathaniel Hackett, who was fired on December 26, 2022, and replaced by Jerry Rosburg on an interim basis for the last two games of the 2022 season.

In the weeks that followed Payton's hiring, the Broncos underwent the following coaching changes:

2023 Denver Broncos coaching staff changes
Position	Previous coach(es)	2023 replacement(s)
Assistant head coach	None	Mike Westhoff
Assistant to the head coach	None	Paul Kelly
Offensive coordinator	Justin Outten, 2022	Joe Lombardi
Quarterbacks coach	Klint Kubiak, 2022	Davis Webb
Pass game coordinator	Klint Kubiak, 2022	John Morton
Running backs coach	Tyrone Wheatley, 2022	Lou Ayeni
Wide receivers coach	Zach Azzanni, 2018–2022	Keary Colbert
Tight ends coach	Jake Moreland, 2022	Declan Doyle
Offensive line coach	Butch Barry (Weeks 1–16, 2022); Ben Steele (interim—Weeks 17 and 18, 2022)	Zach Strief
Assistant offensive line coach	Ben Steele, 2022	Austin King
Offensive quality control coach	Ramon Chinyoung, 2022	Logan Kilgore; Favian Upshaw
Defensive coordinator	Ejiro Evero, 2022	Vance Joseph
Linebackers coach	Peter Hansen, 2022	None
Outside linebackers coach	Bert Watts, 2022	Michael Wilhoite
Inside linebackers coach	None	Greg Manusky
Pass rush specialist	None	Jamar Cain
Assistant defensive backs	Ola Adams, 2022	None
Defensive quality control coach	Andrew Carter, 2022	Addison Lynch; Isaac Shewmaker
Senior defensive assistant	Dom Capers, 2022	Joe Vitt
Special teams coach	Dwayne Stukes (Weeks 1–16, 2022); Mike Mallory (interim—Weeks 17 and 18, 2022)	Ben Kotwica
Assistant special teams coach	Mike Mallory, 2022	Chris Banjo

Sources for this section: Denver Broncos' official website

== Roster changes ==
=== Future contracts ===
All players listed below were signed to reserve/future contracts on January 9, unless otherwise noted. Each player was officially added to the active roster on March 15—the first day of the 2023 league year.

Position	Player	Notes
WR	Victor Bolden Jr.	waived March 14
G	Parker Ferguson	waived May 12
CB	Faion Hicks	waived August 29
CB	Delonte Hood	waived August 27
DE	Jordan Jackson	signed January 11, waived August 29, assigned to the practice squad on August 30
S	Devon Key	waived August 29, assigned to the practice squad on August 30
RB	Tyreik McAllister	waived May 12, re-signed May 15, waived May 31
T	Isaiah Prince	signed February 3, released August 27
LB	Wyatt Ray	released March 20
T	Hunter Thedford	waived May 25
LB	Ray Wilborn	waived August 14

=== Free agents ===
==== Unrestricted ====
Position	Player	2023 team	Notes
LB	Dakota Allen	None	
T	Calvin Anderson	New England Patriots	signed with the Patriots on March 14
CB	Essang Bassey	Los Angeles Chargers	originally an RFA, re-signed March 22, waived October 3, claimed off waivers by the Chargers on October 4
FB	Andrew Beck	Houston Texans	signed with the Texans on March 14
LS	Jacob Bobenmoyer	Las Vegas Raiders	originally an RFA, signed with the Raiders on March 17
RB	Mike Boone	Houston Texans	signed with the Texans on March 14
G	Tom Compton	None	
T	Cameron Fleming	Denver Broncos	re-signed May 23
LB	Jonathan Kongbo	BC Lions (CFL)	originally an ERFA, signed with the BC Lions on May 21
S	Kareem Jackson	Denver Broncos	re-signed May 15
DE	Dre'Mont Jones	Seattle Seahawks	signed with the Seahawks on March 13
S	P. J. Locke	Denver Broncos	originally an RFA, re-signed March 16, placed on injured reserve August 31, returned to the active roster on October 7
RB	Marlon Mack	Arizona Cardinals	signed with the Cardinals on August 4
RB	Latavius Murray	Buffalo Bills	signed with the Bills on May 1
CB	Darius Phillips	Houston Texans	Signed with the Texans on May 4
G	Dalton Risner	Minnesota Vikings	signed with the Vikings on September 18
QB	Brett Rypien	Los Angeles Rams	originally an RFA, signed with the Rams on May 4
TE	Eric Saubert	Miami Dolphins	signed with the Dolphins on March 15
LB	Alex Singleton	Denver Broncos	re-signed March 16
TE	Eric Tomlinson	Houston Texans	signed with the Texans on May 3
T	Billy Turner	New York Jets	Signed with the Jets on May 1
P	Corliss Waitman	New England Patriots	originally an ERFA, assigned tender on March 13, tender rescinded on March 21, signed with the Patriots on March 23
DE	DeShawn Williams	Carolina Panthers	signed with the Panthers on March 15

Note: Unrestricted free agents who were originally Restricted free agents (RFA) had three accrued seasons whose contracts expired at the end of the previous season, and did not receive a qualifying offer before the start of the 2023 league year on March 15.

==== Exclusive-rights ====
Position	Player	Tag	2022 team	Notes
T	Quinn Bailey	ERFA	Denver Broncos	assigned tender on March 13, released August 29, re-signed August 31
LB	Jonas Griffith	ERFA	None	assigned tender on March 13, placed on injured reserve on August 3
Exclusive-Rights Free Agent (ERFA): Players with two or fewer accrued seasons whose contracts expired at the end of the previous season

=== Signings ===
Position	Player	2022 team(s)	Notes
DE	Zach Allen	Arizona Cardinals	signed March 15
WR	Michael Bandy	Los Angeles Chargers	signed July 28, waived August 29, assigned to the practice squad on August 30
FB	Michael Burton	Kansas City Chiefs	signed March 17
WR	Marquez Callaway	New Orleans Saints	signed March 24, waived August 29
LB	Frank Clark	Kansas City Chiefs	signed June 13, released October 14
NT	Keondre Coburn	None	claimed off waivers from the Chiefs on October 20, waived November 14
QB	Ben DiNucci	None	signed May 16, waived August 29, assigned to the practice squad on August 30
P	Riley Dixon	Los Angeles Rams	signed March 21
G	Yasir Durant	New Orleans Saints	signed July 31, designated as waived/injured on August 5
K	Elliott Fry	None	signed May 31, designated as waived/injured on August 15
C	Kyle Fuller	Seattle Seahawks	signed April 3, released August 29
WR	Josh Hammond	None	signed August 22, waived August 29
TE	Tommy Hudson	None	signed June 1, waived August 29
WR	Lil'Jordan Humphrey	New England Patriots	signed March 7, released August 29, assigned to the practice squad on August 30, promoted to the active roster on September 13, released October 11, promoted to the active roster on October 18, released October 20, promoted to the active roster on October 25
RB	Tony Jones Jr.	Seattle Seahawks	signed March 23, waived August 29
WR	J. J. Koski	None	signed August 14, waived August 27
TE	Lucas Krull	New Orleans Saints	promoted to the active roster on December 16
NT	Tyler Lancaster	None	signed May 23, released August 29, assigned to the practice squad on August 30
DT	Tomasi Laulile	None	signed August 23, waived August 29
OT	Mike McGlinchey	San Francisco 49ers	signed March 15
K	Brett Maher	Dallas Cowboys	signed July 25, released August 29
DE	Forrest Merrill	None	signed August 5, designated as waived/injured on August 16
CB	Fabian Moreau	New York Giants	signed August 2, released August 29, re-signed August 31
TE	Chris Manhertz	Jacksonville Jaguars	signed March 15
LB	Durell Nchami	None	signed to practice squad on December 6
NT	Haggai Ndubuisi	None	signed as part of the International Player Pathway Program on May 12, waived August 29, assigned to the practice squad on August 30
LB	Ben Niemann	Arizona Cardinals	promoted to the active roster on October 30
RB	Jacques Patrick	None	signed May 16, waived June 1
RB	Samaje Perine	Cincinnati Bengals	signed March 16
LB	Ronnie Perkins	None	signed from the New England Patriots' practice squad on September 18, waived December 14, assigned to the practice squad on December 16
G	Ben Powers	Baltimore Ravens	signed March 16
CB	Tremon Smith	Houston Texans	signed March 17
QB	Jarrett Stidham	Las Vegas Raiders	signed March 15
CB	Reese Taylor	None	signed to the practice squad on November 8
RB	Dwayne Washington	New Orleans Saints	signed August 16, released August 29, assigned to the practice squad on August 30, promoted to the active roster on October 4

=== Departures ===
Position	Player	Notes
LB	Christopher Allen	waived August 29
RB	Tyler Badie	waived August 29, assigned to the practice squad on August 30
RB	Damarea Crockett	waived June 5
CB	Ronald Darby	released March 14
T	Christian DiLauro	waived July 31
RB	Chase Edmonds	released March 13
C	Graham Glasgow	released March 13
QB	Jarrett Guarantano	waived July 25
WR	Kendall Hinton	waived August 27
CB	Lamar Jackson	waived March 20
K	Brandon McManus	released May 23
LB	Jacob Martin	released May 10
LB	Aaron Patrick	waived August 29
NT	Mike Purcell	released August 29, re-signed August 31
G	Will Sherman	waived August 29, assigned to the practice squad on August 30
WR	Freddie Swain	waived March 14
WR	Montrell Washington	waived August 29

=== Draft ===
2023 Denver Broncos draft selections
Round	Selection	Player	Position	College	Notes
1	5	Traded to the Seattle Seahawks (Note: The Broncos traded first- and second-round selections (5th and 37th overall), 2022 first-, second- and fifth-round selections, QB Drew Lock, DT Shelby Harris and TE Noah Fant to the Seattle Seahawks in exchange for a 2022 fourth-round selection and QB Russell Wilson.)			
1	29	Traded to the New Orleans Saints (Note: The Broncos traded a first-round selection (29th overall) and a 2024 second-round selection to the New Orleans Saints in exchange for a 2024 third-round selection and the coaching rights to Saints head coach Sean Payton.)			From Dolphins (Note: The Broncos traded a 2025 fifth-round selection and LB Bradley Chubb to the Miami Dolphins in exchange for a first-round selection (29th overall), a 2024 fourth-round selection and RB Chase Edmonds.)
2	37	Traded to the Seattle Seahawks			
2	63	Marvin Mims	WR	Oklahoma	From Chiefs via Lions (Note: The Broncos traded third- and fifth-round selections (68th and 138th overall) to the Detroit Lions in exchange for second- and sixth-round selections (63rd and 183rd overall).)
3	67	Drew Sanders	LB	Arkansas	From Colts (Note: The Broncos traded a 2022 third-round selection to the Indianapolis Colts in exchange for a third-round selection (67th overall) and a 2022 fifth-round selection.)
3	68	Traded to the Detroit Lions			
3	83	Riley Moss	CB	Iowa	From Seahawks (Note: The Broncos traded a fourth-round selection (108th overall) and a 2024 third-round selection to the Seattle Seahawks in exchange for a third-round selection (83rd overall).)
4	108	Traded to the Seattle Seahawks			
5	139	Traded to the Detroit Lions			
6	183	JL Skinner	S	Boise State	From Broncos (Note: The Broncos traded a sixth-round selection (183rd overall) and WR Trinity Benson to the Detroit Lions in exchange for 2022 fifth- and seventh-round selections (145th and 234th overall).) via Lions
6	195	Traded to the New Orleans Saints (Note: The Broncos traded a sixth-round selection (195th overall) to the New Orleans Saints in exchange for a seventh-round selection (257th overall) and TE Adam Trautman.)			From Steelers (Note: The Broncos traded a seventh-round selection (241st overall) and LB Malik Reed to the Pittsburgh Steelers in exchange for a sixth-round selection (195th overall).)
7	222	Traded to the San Francisco 49ers (Note: The Broncos traded a seventh-round selection (222nd overall) and a 2022 sixth-round selection to the San Francisco 49ers in exchange for a 2022 seventh-round selection (250th overall) and LB Jonas Griffith.)			
7	241	Traded to the Pittsburgh Steelers			From Vikings (Note: The Broncos traded a 2022 seventh-round selection to the Minnesota Vikings in exchange for a seventh-round selection (241st overall) and DE Stephen Weatherly.)
7	257	Alex Forsyth	C	Oregon	From Saints

Draft trades

=== Undrafted free agents ===
All undrafted free agents were signed prior to the team's rookie minicamp on May 12, unless noted otherwise.

2023 Denver Broncos undrafted free agents
Player	Position	College	Notes
Nate Adkins	TE	South Carolina	made the Week 1 roster
Austin Ajiake	LB	UNLV	signed August 3, waived August 29
Seth Benson	LB	Iowa	waived August 29
Henry Byrd	G	Princeton	waived August 29
Dallas Daniels	WR	Jackson State	waived May 15
Darrious Gaines	CB	Western Colorado	waived May 15
Art Green	CB	Houston	waived August 29, assigned to the practice squad on August 30, promoted to the active roster on January 7
Taylor Grimes	WR	Incarnate Word	waived August 29
Marcus Haynes	LB	Old Dominion	waived August 29, assigned to the practice squad on August 30
Thomas Incoom	LB	Central Michigan	made the Week 1 roster
Demontrey Jacobs	T	South Florida	waived August 29, assigned to the practice squad on August 30
Jack Landherr	LS	UCLA	signed August 15, waived August 23
Kris Leach	TE	Kent State	waived May 15
Jaleel McLaughlin	RB	Youngstown State	made the Week 1 roster
P. J. Mustipher	NT	Penn State	waived August 29, assigned to the practice squad on August 30
Alex Palczewski	T	Illinois	made the Week 1 roster, placed on injured reserve August 31, activated for the team's season finale on January 6
Nick Williams	WR	UNLV	signed June 5, waived June 13, signed July 25, waived July 28, signed August 1, waived August 27
Emanuel Wilson	RB	Fort Valley State	waived May 15

=== Suspensions ===
Eyioma Uwazurike

On July 24, defensive end Eyioma Uwazurike was suspended indefinitely by the NFL for violating the league's gambling policy. Uwazurike, the team's 2022 fourth-round draft selection, bet on NFL games during his rookie season.

Kareem Jackson

Safety Kareem Jackson was suspended twice by the NFL for repeated violations of the league's policy on unnecessary roughness.

On October 23, Jackson was initially suspended four games following the Broncos' Week 7 win over the Green Bay Packers after being ejected for a forceful blow to the head & neck area of Packers' tight end Luke Musgrave, when Musgrave was determined to be a defenseless receiver. Jackson was also ejected during the Broncos' Week 2 loss to the Washington Commanders for a similar hit on Commanders' tight end Logan Thomas, which resulted in Thomas suffering a concussion. Jackson was fined for a total of $89,670 for a series of illegal hits, including violations in three other games—Week 1 against the Las Vegas Raiders, Week 3 against the Miami Dolphins and Week 6 against the Kansas City Chiefs. One day later (October 24), Jackson's suspension was reduced to two games following an appeal hearing.

On November 20, in his first game back from suspension, Jackson was hit with another four-game suspension for lowering his helmet on Minnesota Vikings' quarterback Joshua Dobbs during the Broncos' Week 11 win over the Vikings. Jackson was not flagged for the hit, and he unsuccessfully appealed the suspension.

After he was a healthy scratch for the team's Week 16 loss to the New England Patriots, Jackson was waived on December 25 following a roster exemption, and was claimed off waivers by the Houston Texans the following day.

=== Trades ===
Trade partner	Broncos give	Broncos receive	Source
New Orleans Saints	2024 seventh-round selection	K Wil Lutz	
Philadelphia Eagles	TE Albert Okwuegbunam; 2025 seventh-round selection	2025 sixth-round selection	
San Francisco 49ers	LB Randy Gregory; 2024 seventh-round selection	2024 sixth-round selection	

=== Injuries ===
Position	Player	Time & type of injury	Games missed	Source(s)
LB	Baron Browning	recovery from off-season knee surgery	PUP list, Weeks 1–6	
LB	Frank Clark	hip, Week 1	Weeks 2–4	
TE	Greg Dulcich	hamstring, Week 2	injured reserve, Weeks 2–5	
TE	Greg Dulcich	hamstring, Week 6	season-ending injured reserve, starting with Week 7	
LB	Jonas Griffith	ruptured ACL, preseason workouts	injured reserve, missed the entire 2023 season	
WR	K. J. Hamler	NFI list, preseason designated as waived/NFI on July 31		
WR	Kendall Hinton	recovery from off-season knee surgery	PUP list, July 28 activated on July 28	
WR	Jerry Jeudy	hamstring, preseason	Week 1	
WR	Brandon Johnson	hamstring, October 26 practice	injured reserve, Weeks 8–12	
S	P. J. Locke	dislocated toe, preseason	injured reserve, Weeks 1–4	
S	P. J. Locke	ankle, Week 11	Week 12	
T	Mike McGlinchey	ribs, Week 17	season-ending injured reserve, Week 18	
T	Alex Palczewski	hand, preseason	injured reserve, Weeks 1–17	
WR	Tim Patrick	ruptured Achilles tendon, preseason workouts	injured reserve, missed the entire 2023 season	
NT	Mike Purcell	NFI list, preseason		
S	Justin Simmons	hip, Week 2	Weeks 3–4	
S	Caden Sterns	ruptured patella tendon, Week 1	season-ending injured reserve, starting with Week 2	
WR	Courtland Sutton	concussion, Week 16	Week 17	
S	Delarrin Turner-Yell	ruptured ACL, Week 17	season-ending injured reserve, Week 18	
WR	Jalen Virgil	ruptured meniscus, preseason Week 2	injured reserve, missed the entire 2023 season	
RB	Javonte Williams	hip flexor, Week 4	Week 5	
CB	K'Waun Williams	ankle, preseason	injured reserve, missed the entire 2023 season	

=== Practice squad elevations ===
2023 Denver Broncos standard elevations
Position	Name	Week(s)	Source(s)
WR	Michael Bandy	17	
RB	Tyler Badie	14	
QB	Ben DiNucci	13, 15, 16	
WR	Phillip Dorsett	1	
WR	Lil'Jordan Humphrey	1, 6, 7	
S	Devon Key	18	
TE	Lucas Krull	10, 13, 14	
NT	Tyler Lancaster	6, 12, 15	
LB	Ben Niemann	4	
LB	Ronnie Perkins	16, 17	
WR	Tre'Quan Smith	8	
WR	David Sills	10, 11, 12	
RB	Dwayne Washington	2, 3, 4	

== Personnel ==
=== Staff / Coaches ===
2023 Denver Broncos staff
Front office: President – Damani Leech; General manager – George Paton; Assistant general manager – Darren Mougey; Director of player personnel – Reed Burckhardt; Director of pro personnel – A. J. Durso; Executive director of football operations – Kelly Kleine; Vice president of football administration – Rich Hurtado; Vice president of football operation and compliance – Mark Thewes; Vice president of player development – Ray Jackson; Director of college scouting – Brian Stark; Senior personnel executive – Roman Phifer; Assistant director of college scouting – Nick Schiralli; Head coaches: Head coach – Sean Payton; Assistant to the head coach – Paul Kelly; Offensive coaches: Offensive coordinator – Joe Lombardi; Pass game coordinator – John Morton; Quarterbacks – Davis Webb; Running backs – Lou Ayeni; Wide receivers – Keary Colbert; Tight ends – Declan Doyle; Offensive line – Zach Strief; Assistant offensive line – Austin King; Offensive quality control – Zack Grossi; Offensive quality control – Logan Kilgore; Offensive quality control – Favian Upshaw	Defensive coaches: Defensive coordinator – Vance Joseph; Defensive line – Marcus Dixon; Outside linebackers – Michael Wilhoite; Inside linebackers – Greg Manusky; Defensive backs – Christian Parker; Senior defensive assistant – Joe Vitt; Defense quality control – Addison Lynch; Defense quality control – Isaac Shewmaker; Pass rush specialist – Jamar Cain; Special teams coaches: Assistant head coach – Mike Westhoff; Special teams coordinator – Ben Kotwica; Assistant special teams – Chris Banjo; Strength and conditioning: Vice president of player health and performance – Beau Lowery; Head strength and conditioning – Dan Dalrymple; Assistant strength and conditioning – Korey Jones; Assistant strength and conditioning – Shaun Snee

=== Final roster ===
2023 Denver Broncos roster
Quarterbacks (QB): 4 Jarrett Stidham; 3 Russell Wilson; Running backs (RB): 20 Michael Burton; 38 Jaleel McLaughlin; 25 Samaje Perine; 33 Javonte Williams; Wide receivers (WR): 83 Michael Bandy; 17 Lil'Jordan Humphrey; 10 Jerry Jeudy; 89 Brandon Johnson; 19 Marvin Mims; 14 Courtland Sutton; Tight ends (TE): 45 Nate Adkins; 85 Lucas Krull; 84 Chris Manhertz; 82 Adam Trautman	Offensive linemen (OL): 75 Quinn Bailey G/T; 72 Garett Bolles T; 79 Lloyd Cushenberry C; 73 Cameron Fleming T; 76 Alex Forsyth C; 77 Quinn Meinerz G; 63 Alex Palczewski T; 74 Ben Powers G; 60 Luke Wattenberg C/G; Defensive linemen (DL): 99 Zach Allen DE; 95 Elijah Garcia DE; 92 Jonathan Harris DE; 91 Matt Henningsen DE; 97 D. J. Jones NT; 98 Mike Purcell NT	Linebackers (LB): 42 Nik Bonitto OLB; 56 Baron Browning OLB; 0 Jonathon Cooper OLB; 59 Thomas Incoom OLB; 47 Josey Jewell ILB; 57 Ben Niemann ILB; 41 Drew Sanders ILB; 49 Alex Singleton ILB; 40 Justin Strnad ILB; Defensive backs (DB): 28 Art Green CB; 6 P. J. Locke SS; 27 Damarri Mathis CB; 29 Ja'Quan McMillian CB; 23 Fabian Moreau CB; 37 Riley Moss CB; 31 Justin Simmons FS; 34 JL Skinner FS; 1 Tremon Smith CB; 2 Patrick Surtain II CB; Special teams (ST): 9 Riley Dixon P; 48 Mitchell Fraboni LS; 16 Wil Lutz K	Practice squad: 36 Tyler Badie RB; 11 Ben DiNucci QB; 13 Phillip Dorsett WR; 90 Jordan Jackson DE; 71 Demontrey Jacobs T; 26 Devon Key FS; 96 Tyler Lancaster NT; 86 Johnny Lumpkin TE; 53 Durell Nchami OLB; 64 Haggai Ndubuisi NT (IPP); 51 Ronnie Perkins OLB; 78 Will Sherman G/T; 87 David Sills WR; 43 Keidron Smith CB; 81 Tre'Quan Smith WR; 35 Reese Taylor CB; Reserve: 80 Greg Dulcich TE (IR); 50 Jonas Griffith ILB (IR); 69 Mike McGlinchey T (IR); 12 Tim Patrick WR (IR); 30 Caden Sterns SS (IR); 32 Delarrin Turner-Yell FS (IR); 96 Eyioma Uwazurike DE (Susp.); 15 Jalen Virgil WR (IR); 39 Dwayne Washington RB (NF-Ill.); 8 K'Waun Williams CB (IR); Rookies in italics 53 active, 22 reserve, 14 practice squad (2 exempt)

== Preseason ==
Week	Date	Opponent	Result	Record	Venue	Recap
1	August 11	at Arizona Cardinals	L 17–18	0–1	State Farm Stadium	Recap
2	August 19	at San Francisco 49ers	L 20–21	0–2	Levi's Stadium	Recap
3	August 26	Los Angeles Rams	W 41–0	1–2	Empower Field at Mile High	Recap

== Regular season ==
=== Schedule ===
Week	Date	Opponent	Result	Record	Venue	Recap
1	September 10	**Las Vegas Raiders**	**L** 16–17	0–1	Empower Field at Mile High	Recap
2	September 17	Washington Commanders	**L** 33–35	0–2	Empower Field at Mile High	Recap
3	September 24	at Miami Dolphins	**L** 20–70	0–3	Hard Rock Stadium	Recap
4	October 1	at Chicago Bears	**W** 31–28	1–3	Soldier Field	Recap
5	October 8	New York Jets	**L** 21–31	1–4	Empower Field at Mile High	Recap
6	October 12	at **Kansas City Chiefs**	**L** 8–19	1–5	Arrowhead Stadium	Recap
7	October 22	Green Bay Packers	**W** 19–17	2–5	Empower Field at Mile High	Recap
8	October 29	**Kansas City Chiefs**	**W** 24–9	3–5	Empower Field at Mile High	Recap
9	Bye					
10	November 13	at Buffalo Bills	**W** 24–22	4–5	Highmark Stadium	Recap
11	November 19	Minnesota Vikings	**W** 21–20	5–5	Empower Field at Mile High	Recap
12	November 26	Cleveland Browns	**W** 29–12	6–5	Empower Field at Mile High	Recap
13	December 3	at Houston Texans	**L** 17–22	6–6	NRG Stadium	Recap
14	December 10	at **Los Angeles Chargers**	**W** 24–7	7–6	SoFi Stadium	Recap
15	December 16	at Detroit Lions	**L** 17–42	7–7	Ford Field	Recap
16	December 24	New England Patriots	**L** 23–26	7–8	Empower Field at Mile High	Recap
17	December 31	**Los Angeles Chargers**	**W** 16–9	8–8	Empower Field at Mile High	Recap
18	January 7	at **Las Vegas Raiders**	**L** 14–27	8–9	Allegiant Stadium	Recap

Note: Intra-division opponents are in bold text.

=== Game summaries ===
==== Week 1: vs. Las Vegas Raiders ====
Week 1: Las Vegas Raiders at Denver Broncos – Game summary

Quarter	1	2	3	4	Total
**Raiders**	7	3	0	7	**17**
Broncos	6	7	0	3	**16**

at Empower Field at Mile High, Denver, Colorado

- Date: September 10
- Game time: 2:25 p.m. MDT
- Game weather: Cloudy, 64 °F (18 °C)
- Game attendance: 76,299
- Referee: Bill Vinovich
- TV announcers (CBS): Tom McCarthy, James Lofton, Jay Feely and Tiffany Blackmon
- Recap, Game Book

Game information

**First quarter**

- LV – Jakobi Meyers 3-yard pass from Jimmy Garoppolo (Daniel Carlson kick), 9:28. Raiders 7–0. **Drive: 10 plays, 44 yards, 5:32.**
- DEN – Lil'Jordan Humphrey 5-yard pass from Russell Wilson (kick failed), 0:44. Raiders 7–6. **Drive: 14 plays, 86 yards, 8:44.**

**Second quarter**

- LV – Daniel Carlson 24-yard field goal, 10:54. Raiders 10–6. **Drive: 10 plays, 70 yards, 4:50.**
- DEN – Courtland Sutton 5-yard pass from Russell Wilson (Wil Lutz kick), 0:12. Broncos 13–10. **Drive: 9 plays, 75 yards, 2:18.**

**Third quarter**

- No scoring plays.

**Fourth quarter**

- DEN – Wil Lutz 24-yard field goal, 8:54. Broncos 16–10. **Drive: 16 plays, 75 yards, 8:07.**
- LV – Jakobi Meyers 6-yard pass from Jimmy Garoppolo (Daniel Carlson kick), 6:34. Raiders 17–16. **Drive: 6 plays, 75 yards, 2:20.**

**Top passers**

- LV – Jimmy Garoppolo – 20/26, 200 yards, 2 TD, INT
- DEN – Russell Wilson – 27/34, 177 yards, 2 TD

**Top rushers**

- LV – Josh Jacobs – 19 rushes, 48 yards
- DEN – Javonte Williams – 13 rushes, 52 yards

**Top receivers**

- LV – Jakobi Meyers – 9 receptions, 81 yards, 2 TD
- DEN – Samaje Perine – 4 receptions, 37 yards

The Broncos kicked off the 2023 season against their AFC West division rival Las Vegas Raiders. This marked Sean Payton's debut as the Broncos' head coach. The Raiders grabbed the early lead on their initial possession, with quarterback Jimmy Garoppolo connecting on a 3-yard touchdown pass to wide receiver Jakobi Meyers. The Broncos responded on their first possession, with a 5-yard touchdown pass from quarterback Russell Wilson to wide receiver Lil'Jordan Humphrey. However, placekicker Wil Lutz missed wide-right on the extra point attempt — a miscue that would prove to be critical to the game's outcome. A 24-yard field goal by placekicker Daniel Carlson gave the Raiders a 10–6 lead early in the second quarter. The Broncos took their first just lead before halftime, with Wilson's second touchdown pass of the first half — a 5-yarder to wide receiver Courtland Sutton.

Lutz missed wide right on a 55-yard field goal attempt on the initial possession of the second half. The Raiders then marched down the field and faced a 3rd-and-goal from the Broncos' 6-yard line. However, Garoppolo was intercepted by safety Kareem Jackson in the end zone for a touchback, late in the third quarter. The Broncos then had a first-and-goal from the Raiders' 8-yard line; however, they failed to score a touchdown, and instead, settled for a 24-yard field goal by Lutz midway through the fourth quarter. The Raiders took a 17–16 lead six plays later, with another touchdown pass from Garoppolo to Meyers — from 6 yards out. The Broncos went three-and-out, and were forced to punt. The Raiders faced a 3rd-and-8 from their own 44-yard line with exactly three minutes left in the game. Meyers was stopped one yard short of a first down on a pass completion from Garoppolo; however, Jackson was flagged for an unnecessary roughness flag for a helmet-to-helmet hit on Meyers, giving the Raiders a first down. The Broncos' defense was unable to stop Garoppolo from scrambling for a game-clinching 8-yard first down run.

==== Week 2: vs. Washington Commanders ====
Week 2: Washington Commanders at Denver Broncos – Game summary

Quarter	1	2	3	4	Total
**Commanders**	3	11	7	14	**35**
Broncos	14	7	3	9	**33**

at Empower Field at Mile High, Denver, Colorado

- Date: September 17
- Game time: 2:25 p.m. MDT
- Game weather: Sunny, 81 °F (27 °C)
- Game attendance: 76,108
- Referee: Brad Rogers
- TV announcers (CBS): Spero Dedes, Adam Archuleta and Aditi Kinkhabwala
- Recap, Game Book

Game information

**First quarter**

- DEN – Jaleel McLaughlin 5-yard run (Wil Lutz kick), 6:14. Broncos 7–0. **Drive: 7 plays, 61 yards, 4:05.**
- WAS – Joey Slye 44-yard field goal, 0:24. Broncos 7–3. **Drive: 11 plays, 50 yards, 5:50.**
- DEN – Marvin Mims 60-yard pass from Russell Wilson (Wil Lutz kick), 0:12. Broncos 14–3. **Drive: 1 plays, 75 yards, 0:12.**

**Second quarter**

- DEN – Brandon Johnson 16-yard pass from Russell Wilson (Wil Lutz kick), 9:01. Broncos 21–3. **Drive: 9 plays, 90 yards, 5:01.**
- WAS – Logan Thomas 4-yard pass from Sam Howell (Brian Robinson Jr. run), 1:47. Broncos 21–11. **Drive: 9 plays, 49 yards, 4:47.**
- WAS – Joey Slye 49-yard field goal, 0:00. Broncos 21–14. **Drive: 8 plays, 46 yards, 1:20.**

**Third quarter**

- WAS – Terry McLaurin 30-yard pass from Sam Howell (Joey Slye kick), 11:47. Tied 21–21. **Drive: 5 plays, 57 yards, 2:01.**
- DEN – Wil Lutz 31-yard field goal, 2:11. Broncos 24–21. **Drive: 9 plays, 38 yards, 5:21.**

**Fourth quarter**

- WAS – Brian Robinson Jr. 2-yard run (Joey Slye kick), 13:25. Commanders 28–24. **Drive: 6 plays, 75 yards, 3:46.**
- WAS – Brian Robinson Jr. 15-yard run (Joey Slye kick), 7:11. Commanders 35–24. **Drive: 8 plays, 64 yards, 5:11.**
- DEN – Wil Lutz 32-yard field goal, 1:50. Commanders 35–27. **Drive: 15 plays, 61 yards, 5:21.**
- DEN – Brandon Johnson 50-yard pass from Russell Wilson (pass failed), 0:00. Commanders 35–33. **Drive: 7 plays, 87 yards, 0:48.**

**Top passers**

- WAS – Sam Howell – 27/39, 299 yards, 2 TD
- DEN – Russell Wilson – 18/32, 308 yards, 3 TD, INT

**Top rushers**

- WAS – Brian Robinson Jr. – 18 rushes, 87 yards
- DEN – Russell Wilson – 6 rushes, 56 yards

**Top receivers**

- WAS – Terry McLaurin – 5 receptions, 54 yards, TD
- DEN – Marvin Mims – 2 receptions, 113 yards, TD

The Broncos took a 21–3 lead over the Commanders with touchdowns on each of their first three possessions, consisting of a 5-yard touchdown run by running back Jaleel McLaughlin and two touchdown passes from quarterback Russell Wilson — a 60-yarder to wide receiver Marvin Mims and a 16-yarder to wide receiver Brandon Johnson. However, the Broncos' offense would sputter for the remainder of the game and their defense was unable to stop the Commanders. After Wilson was strip-sacked by linebacker Jamin Davis, the momentum shifted to the Commanders. Quarterback Sam Howell connected on a 4-yard touchdown pass to tight end Logan Thomas on a 4th-and-goal, with a two-point conversion that was initially ruled unsuccessful, but overturned by review. The Broncos' lead was narrowed to 21–14 just before halftime, with a 49-yard field goal by Commanders' placekicker Joey Slye, who missed from 49 and made from 44 in the first quarter.

After a Broncos' three-and-out to start the second half, the Commanders tied the game at 21–21, with Howell throwing a 30-yard touchdown pass to wide receiver Terry McLaurin. Following an interception of Russell, Slye missed wide-right on a 59-yard field goal attempt. The Broncos reached the red zone on the ensuing possession, but were forced to settle for a 31-yard field goal by placekicker Wil Lutz. The Commanders took their first lead of the game early in the fourth quarter, with running back Brian Robinson Jr. rushing for a 2-yard touchdown, then added to their lead, with another rushing touchdown by Robinson — a 15-yarder midway through the fourth quarter. After being outscored 32–3 since early in the second quarter, the Broncos found themselves trailing 35–24. A 32-yard field goal by Lutz on the first play after the two-minute warning pulled the Broncos to a 35–27 deficit. After burning all of their team timeouts and forcing a Commanders' punt, the Broncos had one last possession at their own 13-yard line and with 48 seconds remaining. With 3 seconds remaining, Wilson heaved a desperation hail mary pass that was caught by Johnson for a touchdown. The Broncos needed a two-point conversion to send the game to overtime. However, Wilson's pass that was intended for wide receiver Courtland Sutton fell incomplete.

==== Week 3: at Miami Dolphins ====
Week 3: Denver Broncos at Miami Dolphins – Game summary

Quarter	1	2	3	4	Total
Broncos	7	6	0	7	**20**
**Dolphins**	14	21	14	21	**70**

at Hard Rock Stadium, Miami Gardens, Florida

- Date: September 24
- Game time: 1:00 p.m. EDT/11:00 a.m. MDT
- Game weather: Partly cloudy, 86 °F (30 °C)
- Game attendance: 65,522
- Referee: Clay Martin
- TV announcers (CBS): Kevin Harlan, Trent Green and Melanie Collins
- Recap, Game Book

Game information

**First quarter**

- MIA – Tyreek Hill 54-yard pass from Tua Tagovailoa (Jason Sanders kick), 13:37. Dolphins 7–0. **Drive: 3 plays, 75 yards, 1:23.**
- MIA – De'Von Achane 8-yard run (Jason Sanders kick), 6:31. Dolphins 14–0. **Drive: 9 plays, 81 yards, 5:33.**
- DEN – Courtland Sutton 12-yard pass from Russell Wilson (Wil Lutz kick), 1:12. Dolphins 14–7. **Drive: 10 plays, 75 yards, 5:19.**

**Second quarter**

- MIA – De'Von Achane 4-yard pass from Tua Tagovailoa (Jason Sanders kick), 10:16. Dolphins 21–7. **Drive: 14 plays, 75 yards, 5:56.**
- DEN – Wil Lutz 31-yard field goal, 6:36. Dolphins 21–10. **Drive: 8 plays, 62 yards, 3:40.**
- MIA – Raheem Mostert 20-yard run (Jason Sanders kick), 1:49. Dolphins 28–10. **Drive: 6 plays, 86 yards, 1:20.**
- MIA – Raheem Mostert 3-yard run (Jason Sanders kick), 1:29. Dolphins 35–10. **Drive: 1 play, 3 yards, 1:29.**
- DEN – Wil Lutz 25-yard field goal, 0:03. Dolphins 35–13. **Drive: 9 plays, 68 yards, 1:26.**

**Third quarter**

- MIA – Raheem Mostert 1-yard run (Jason Sanders kick), 7:48. Dolphins 42–13. **Drive: 11 plays, 90 yards, 4:29.**
- MIA – Raheem Mostert 19-yard pass from Tua Tagovailoa (Jason Sanders kick), 0:29. Dolphins 49–13. **Drive: 9 plays, 77 yards, 4:44.**

**Fourth quarter**

- MIA – De'Von Achane 10-yard pass from Tua Tagovailoa (Jason Sanders kick), 14:55. Dolphins 56–13. **Drive: 2 plays, 8 yards, 0:20.**
- MIA – Robbie Chosen 68-yard pass from Mike White (Jason Sanders kick), 9:05. Dolphins 63–13. **Drive: 3 plays, 68 yards, 1:23.**
- DEN – Marvin Mims 99-yard kickoff return (Wil Lutz kick), 8:50. Dolphins 63–20.
- MIA – De'Von Achane 67-yard run (Jason Sanders kick), 8:01. Dolphins 70–20. **Drive: 2 plays, 75 yards, 0:49.**

**Top passers**

- DEN – Russell Wilson – 23/38, 306 yards, TD, INT
- MIA – Tua Tagovailoa – 23/26, 309 yards, 4 TD

**Top rushers**

- DEN – Javonte Williams – 11 rushes, 42 yards
- MIA – De'Von Achane – 18 rushes, 203 yards, 2 TD

**Top receivers**

- DEN – Courtland Sutton – 8 receptions, 91 yards, TD
- MIA – Tyreek Hill – 9 receptions, 157 yards, TD

The Broncos were overwhelmed by the Dolphins, in an embarrassing 70–20 loss. The Broncos' defense surrendered franchise worsts in points (70), yards (726) and overall touchdowns in one game (10), and tied a franchise record for rushing touchdowns in one game (5). The 50-point loss was the third-worst margin of defeat in Broncos' franchise history, behind a 59–7 loss to the Kansas City Chiefs in 1963 and a 51–0 loss to the Oakland Raiders in 1967. Dolphins' quarterback Tua Tagovailoa threw for four touchdowns, with most of the help coming from running backs Raheem Mostert and De'Von Achane, who combined for eight of the ten total touchdowns. Broncos' quarterback Russell Wilson threw for 306 yards and only one touchdown, while wide receiver Marvin Mims returned a kickoff 99 yards for a touchdown.

The 70 points scored by the Dolphins was tied for the second-most in a single regular-season game in NFL history, only trailing a 72-point output by the Washington Redskins in 1966.

==== Week 4: at Chicago Bears ====
Week 4: Denver Broncos at Chicago Bears – Game summary

Quarter	1	2	3	4	Total
**Broncos**	7	0	7	17	**31**
Bears	0	21	7	0	**28**

at Soldier Field, Chicago, Illinois

- Date: October 1
- Game time: 12:00 p.m. CDT/11:00 a.m. MDT
- Game weather: Sunny, 80 °F (27 °C)
- Game attendance: 62,220
- Referee: Carl Cheffers
- TV announcers (CBS): Andrew Catalon, Tiki Barber, Matt Ryan and AJ Ross
- Recap, Game Book

Game information

**First quarter**

- DEN – Jaleel McLaughlin 18-yard pass from Russell Wilson (Wil Lutz kick), 5:08. Broncos 7–0. **Drive: 11 plays, 84 yards, 6:12.**

**Second quarter**

- CHI – D. J. Moore 29-yard pass from Justin Fields (Cairo Santos kick), 14:53. Tied 7–7. **Drive: 9 plays, 75 yards, 5:15.**
- CHI – Cole Kmet 22-yard pass from Justin Fields (Cairo Santos kick), 11:44. Bears 14–7. **Drive: 3 plays, 44 yards, 1:16.**
- CHI – Cole Kmet 3-yard pass from Justin Fields (Cairo Santos kick), 6:08. Bears 21–7. **Drive: 5 plays, 85 yards, 2:27.**

**Third quarter**

- CHI – Khalil Herbert 2-yard pass from Justin Fields (Cairo Santos kick), 4:11. Bears 28–7. **Drive: 15 plays, 66 yards, 9:26.**
- DEN – Brandon Johnson 4-yard pass from Russell Wilson (Wil Lutz kick), 0:14. Bears 28–14. **Drive: 7 plays, 75 yards, 3:57.**

**Fourth quarter**

- DEN – Courtland Sutton 13-yard pass from Russell Wilson (Wil Lutz kick), 9:36. Bears 28–21. **Drive: 10 plays, 66 yards, 4:20.**
- DEN – Jonathon Cooper 35-yard fumble return (Wil Lutz kick), 6:55. Tied 28–28.
- DEN – Wil Lutz 51-yard field goal, 1:46. Broncos 31–28. **Drive: 5 plays, 48 yards, 1:06.**

**Top passers**

- DEN – Russell Wilson – 21/28, 223 yards, 3 TD
- CHI – Justin Fields – 28/35, 335 yards, 4 TD, INT

**Top rushers**

- DEN – Jaleel McLaughlin – 7 rushes, 72 yards
- CHI – Khalil Herbert – 18 rushes, 103 yards

**Top receivers**

- DEN – Jerry Jeudy – 3 receptions, 52 yards
- CHI – D. J. Moore – 8 receptions, 131 yards, TD

The Broncos took the early lead over the Bears on their initial possession, with quarterback Russell Wilson connecting on an 18-yard touchdown pass with running back Jaleel McLaughlin. The Broncos' offense would then sputter, failing to advance past their own 44-yard line on their next four possessions, and the Bears reeled off 28 unanswered points. The Broncos' defense yielded four touchdown passes to Bears' quarterback Justin Fields—two to tight end Cole Kmet, and one apiece to wide receiver D. J. Moore and running back Khalil Herbert. The Broncos trailed 28–7 with 4:10 remaining in the third quarter, but proceeded to score the final 24 points of the game. Wilson threw a 4-yard touchdown pass to wide receiver Brandon Johnson near the end of the third quarter, followed in the fourth quarter by a 13-yarder to wide receiver Courtland Sutton. Then the Broncos' defense came up with a crucial turnover, with linebacker Nik Bonitto forcing a strip sack and fumble off Fields, and linebacker Jonathon Cooper returning the fumble 42 yards for a game-tying touchdown midway through the fourth quarter. The Bears then marched down the field, and faced a 4th-and-1 at the Broncos' 18-yard line with 2:57 remaining in the fourth quarter. However, instead of a go-ahead field goal, the Bears decided to go for a first-down, but turned the football over on downs when Fields was tackled for no gain by linebacker Alex Singleton. Five plays later, a 51-yard field goal by placekicker Wil Lutz put the Broncos ahead to stay with 1:51 remaining in the game. The Bears attempted a rally, but after reaching their own 47-yard line, Fields was intercepted by safety Kareem Jackson for the Broncos' first win of the season.

==== Week 5: vs. New York Jets ====
Week 5: New York Jets at Denver Broncos – Game summary

Quarter	1	2	3	4	Total
**Jets**	5	3	10	13	**31**
Broncos	7	6	0	8	**21**

at Empower Field at Mile High, Denver, Colorado

- Date: October 8
- Game time: 2:25 p.m. MDT
- Game weather: Sunny, 73 °F (23 °C)
- Game attendance: 76,387
- Referee: John Hussey
- TV announcers (CBS): Andrew Catalon, Tiki Barber, Matt Ryan and AJ Ross
- Recap, Game Book

Game information

**First quarter**

- NYJ – Greg Zuerlein 30-yard field goal, 11:19. Jets 3–0. **Drive: 8 plays, 9 yards, 3:41.**
- DEN – Jaleel McLaughlin 22-yard pass from Russell Wilson (Wil Lutz kick), 7:34. Broncos 7–3. **Drive: 6 plays, 75 yards, 3:45.**
- NYJ – Intentional grounding penalty on Russell Wilson in end zone for a safety, 4:17. Broncos 7–5.

**Second quarter**

- DEN – Wil Lutz 23-yard field goal, 12:47. Broncos 10–5. **Drive: 8 plays, 52 yards, 4:12.**
- NYJ – Greg Zuerlein 26-yard field goal, 6:41. Broncos 10–8. **Drive: 11 plays, 67 yards, 6:06.**
- DEN – Wil Lutz 22-yard field goal, 1:48. Broncos 13–8. **Drive: 11 plays, 71 yards, 4:53.**

**Third quarter**

- NYJ – Breece Hall 72-yard run (Greg Zuerlein kick), 13:29. Jets 15–13. **Drive: 1 play, 72 yards, 0:10.**
- NYJ – Greg Zuerlein 27-yard field goal, 5:16. Jets 18–13. **Drive: 10 plays, 40 yards, 6:03.**

**Fourth quarter**

- NYJ – Greg Zuerlein 22-yard field goal, 12:19. Jets 21–13. **Drive: 10 plays, 47 yards, 5:52.**
- NYJ – Greg Zuerlein 49-yard field goal, 7:27. Jets 24–13. **Drive: 5 plays, 41 yards, 2:58.**
- DEN – Adam Trautman 3-yard pass from Russell Wilson (Michael Burton run), 4:44. Jets 24–21. **Drive: 7 plays, 75 yards, 2:43.**
- NYJ – Bryce Hall 39-yard fumble return (Greg Zuerlein kick), 0:29. Jets 31–21.

**Top passers**

- NYJ – Zach Wilson – 19/26, 199 yards, INT
- DEN – Russell Wilson – 20/31, 196 yards, 2 TD

**Top rusher**

- NYJ – Breece Hall – 22 rushes, 177 yards, TD
- DEN – Jaleel McLaughlin – 9 rushes, 68 yards

**Top receiver**

- NYJ – Tyler Conklin – 4 receptions, 67 yards
- DEN – Samaje Perine – 4 receptions, 73 yards

Following a 30-yard field goal by Jets' placekicker Greg Zuerlein, the Broncos grabbed the lead, with a 22-yard touchdown pass from quarterback Russell Wilson to running back Jaleel McLaughlin. On the Broncos' next possession, Wilson was penalized for intentional grounding in the end zone for a safety. The Broncos led 13–8 at halftime, after two short field goals by placekicker Wil Lutz—from 22 and 23 yards out, with a 26-yard field goal by Zuerlein in between. After the Broncos went three-and-out to start the second half, Jets' running back Breece Hall ran for a 72-yard touchdown—the first of 16 unanswered Jets points. Zuerlein added three more field goals—a 27-yarder in the third quarter, followed by 27- and 49-yarders in the fourth quarter. The Broncos trailed 24–13 midway through the fourth quarter, after two punts and a lost fumble in Jets' territory. A 3-yard touchdown pass from Russell Wilson to tight end Adam Trautman, coupled with a successful two-point conversion by fullback Michael Burton, pulled the Broncos to within a 24–21 deficit with 4:48 remaining in the fourth quarter. The Jets were attempting to run out the clock, and faced a 3rd-and-5 at the Broncos' 27-yard line; however, quarterback Zach Wilson was intercepted by cornerback Patrick Surtain II near the goal line. With 2:14 remaining in the game, the Broncos attempted a rally, but Russell Wilson was strip-sacked by Jets' defensive tackle Quinnen Williams, and cornerback Bryce Hall returned the fumble 39 yards for the game-clinching touchdown.

==== Week 6: at Kansas City Chiefs ====
Week 6: Denver Broncos at Kansas City Chiefs – Game summary

Quarter	1	2	3	4	Total
Broncos	0	0	0	8	**8**
**Chiefs**	3	10	3	3	**19**

at Arrowhead Stadium, Kansas City, Missouri

- Date: October 12
- Game time: 7:15 p.m. CDT/6:15 p.m. MDT
- Game weather: 62 °F (17 °C)
- Game attendance: 73,528
- Referee: Shawn Hochuli
- TV announcers (KMGH/Prime Video): Al Michaels, Kirk Herbstreit and Kaylee Hartung
- Recap, Game Book

Game information

**First quarter**

- KC – Harrison Butker 35-yard field goal, 5:40. Chiefs 3–0. **Drive: 9 plays, 42 yards, 3:44.**

**Second quarter**

- KC – Kadarius Toney 3-yard pass from Patrick Mahomes (Harrison Butker kick), 3:06. Chiefs 10–0. **Drive: 7 plays, 62 yards, 3:22.**
- KC – Harrison Butker 60-yard field goal, 0:00. Chiefs 13–0. **Drive: 3 plays, 19 yards, 0:15.**

**Third quarter**

- KC – Harrison Butker 25-yard field goal, 9:16. Chiefs 16–0. **Drive: 12 plays, 68 yards, 5:44.**

**Fourth quarter**

- DEN – Courtland Sutton 11-yard pass from Russell Wilson (Javonte Williams run), 6:07. Chiefs 16–8. **Drive: 6 plays, 61 yards, 3:15.**
- KC – Harrison Butker 52-yard field goal, 1:59. Chiefs 19–8. **Drive: 9 plays, 41 yards, 4:08.**

**Top passers**

- DEN – Russell Wilson – 13/22, 95 yards, TD, 2 INT
- KC – Patrick Mahomes – 30/40, 306 yards, TD, INT

**Top rushers**

- DEN – Javonte Williams – 10 rushes, 52 yards
- KC – Isiah Pacheco – 16 rushes, 62 yards

**Top receivers**

- DEN – Courtland Sutton – 4 receptions, 46 yards, TD
- KC – Travis Kelce – 9 receptions, 124 yards

The Broncos' defense limited Chiefs' quarterback Patrick Mahomes to one touchdown pass and four field goals by placekicker Harrison Butker, but the defensive effort was wasted by a poor performance by the offense. Quarterback Russell Wilson completed 13 of 22 passes for only 95 yards, and the Broncos trailed 16–0 at the 9:22 mark of the fourth quarter. Wilson finally got the Broncos on the scoreboard, with an 11-yard touchdown pass to wide receiver Courtland Sutton that was initially ruled as an incomplete pass, but overturned by a booth review. The subsequent two-point conversion by running back Javonte Williams pulled the Broncos to within a 16–8 deficit with six minutes remaining in the game. However, Butker's fourth field goal of the game—a 52-yarder at the two-minute warning, put the game out of reach. It was the Chiefs' 16th consecutive win over the Broncos—a streak that ended two weeks later in Denver.

==== Week 7: vs. Green Bay Packers ====
Week 7: Green Bay Packers at Denver Broncos – Game summary

Quarter	1	2	3	4	Total
Packers	0	0	10	7	**17**
**Broncos**	3	6	7	3	**19**

at Empower Field at Mile High, Denver, Colorado

- Date: October 22
- Game time: 2:25 p.m. MDT
- Game weather: Sunny, 72 °F (22 °C)
- Game attendance: 76,880
- Referee: Alex Kemp
- TV announcers (CBS): Kevin Harlan, Trent Green and Melanie Collins
- Recap, Game Book

Game information

**First quarter**

- DEN – Wil Lutz 32-yard field goal, 8:27. Broncos 3–0. **Drive: 11 plays, 62 yards, 6:33.**

**Second quarter**

- DEN – Wil Lutz 29-yard field goal, 13:14. Broncos 6–0. **Drive: 11 plays, 70 yards, 4:17.**
- DEN – Wil Lutz 35-yard field goal, 0:05. Broncos 9–0. **Drive: 6 plays, 50 yards, 0:36.**

**Third quarter**

- GB – Anders Carlson 29-yard field goal, 10:24. Broncos 9–3. **Drive: 12 plays, 64 yards, 4:36.**
- DEN – Courtland Sutton 18-yard pass from Russell Wilson (Wil Lutz kick), 6:17. Broncos 16–3. **Drive: 7 plays, 75 yards, 4:07.**
- GB – Romeo Doubs 16-yard pass from Jordan Love (Anders Carlson kick), 1:46. Broncos 16–10. **Drive: 9 plays, 75 yards, 4:31.**

**Fourth quarter**

- GB – Jayden Reed 4-yard pass from Jordan Love (Anders Carlson kick), 8:31. Packers 17–16. **Drive: 11 plays, 76 yards, 6:19.**
- DEN – Wil Lutz 52-yard field goal, 3:50. Broncos 19–17. **Drive: 9 plays, 41 yards, 4:41.**

**Top passers**

- GB – Jordan Love – 21/31, 180 yards, 2 TD, INT
- DEN – Russell Wilson – 20/29, 194 yards, TD

**Top rushers**

- GB – A. J. Dillon – 15 rushes, 61 yards
- DEN – Javonte Williams – 15 rushes, 82 yards

**Top receivers**

- GB – Luke Musgrave – 4 receptions, 30 yards
- DEN – Courtland Sutton – 6 receptions, 76 yards, TD

Midway through the third quarter, all of the scoring came by way of the placekickers—three field goals by the Broncos' Wil Lutz, and one by the Packers' Anders Carlson. The Broncos increased their lead to 16–3, with the game's first touchdown—an 18-yard pass from quarterback Russell Wilson to wide receiver Courtland Sutton. However, the Packers' responded, with two touchdown passes by quarterback Jordan Love—a 16-yarder to wide receiver Romeo Doubs, followed by a 4-yarder to wide receiver Jayden Reed that gave the Packers a 17–16 lead midway through the fourth quarter. Nine plays later, the Broncos re-claimed the lead, with Lutz's fourth field goal of the game—a 52-yarder with 3:54 remaining in the game. The Packers attempted a rally, but Love was intercepted by safety P. J. Locke deep in Broncos' territory. The Broncos then ran out the clock.

==== Week 8: vs. Kansas City Chiefs ====
Week 8: Kansas City Chiefs at Denver Broncos – Game summary

Quarter	1	2	3	4	Total
Chiefs	3	6	0	0	**9**
**Broncos**	7	7	0	10	**24**

at Empower Field at Mile High, Denver, Colorado

- Date: October 29
- Game time: 2:25 p.m. MDT
- Game weather: Cold, getting colder, a few light flakes of snow falling, 26 °F (−3 °C)
- Game attendance: 76,286
- Referee: Brad Allen
- TV announcers (CBS): Kevin Harlan, Trent Green and Melanie Collins
- Recap, Game Book

Game information

**First quarter**

- DEN – Javonte Williams 4-yard pass from Russell Wilson (Wil Lutz kick), 7:56. Broncos 7–0. **Drive: 10 plays, 39 yards, 5:20.**
- KC – Harrison Butker 23-yard field goal, 1:11. Broncos 7–3. **Drive: 12 plays, 71 yards, 6:45.**

**Second quarter**

- DEN – Jerry Jeudy 11-yard pass from Russell Wilson (Wil Lutz kick), 11:51. Broncos 14–3. **Drive: 3 plays, 50 yards, 1:12.**
- KC – Harrison Butker 34-yard field goal, 5:39. Broncos 14–6. **Drive: 5 plays, 44 yards, 2:47.**
- KC – Harrison Butker 56-yard field goal, 0:00. Broncos 14–9. **Drive: 2 plays, 11 yards, 0:09.**

**Third quarter**

- No scoring plays.

**Fourth quarter**

- DEN – Courtland Sutton 6-yard pass from Russell Wilson (Wil Lutz kick), 10:33. Broncos 21–9. **Drive: 13 plays, 65 yards, 7:12.**
- DEN – Wil Lutz 28-yard field goal, 0:31. Broncos 24–9. **Drive: 7 plays, 10 yards, 4:14.**

**Top passers**

- KC – Patrick Mahomes – 24/38, 241 yards, 2 INT
- DEN – Russell Wilson – 12/19, 114 yards, 3 TD

**Top rushers**

- KC – Isiah Pacheco – 8 rushes, 40 yards
- DEN – Javonte Williams – 27 rushes, 85 yards

**Top receivers**

- KC – Travis Kelce – 6 receptions, 58 yards
- DEN – Jerry Jeudy – 2 receptions, 50 yards, TD

The Broncos' defense forced five turnovers—three fumbles and two interceptions off Chiefs' quarterback Patrick Mahomes, and limited the Chiefs' offense to three field goals—all in the first half—in a 24–9 win. It was the first time since Week 13 of the 2021 season (also against the Broncos) in which Mahomes did not throw a touchdown pass. Broncos' quarterback Russell Wilson threw three touchdown passes—one apiece to running back Javonte Williams and wide receivers Jerry Jeudy and Courtland Sutton. The Broncos held a 14–9 lead early in the fourth quarter, and after Chiefs' return specialist Mecole Hardman muffed a punt, Wilson threw a 6-yard touchdown pass to Sutton and placekicker Wil Lutz later capped the scoring off with a 28-yard field goal with only 31 seconds remaining. With the win, the Broncos snapped a 16-game losing streak to the Chiefs, dating back to 2015.

==== Week 10: at Buffalo Bills ====
Week 10: Denver Broncos at Buffalo Bills – Game summary

Quarter	1	2	3	4	Total
**Broncos**	3	12	0	9	**24**
Bills	0	8	7	7	**22**

at Highmark Stadium, Orchard Park, New York

- Date: November 13
- Game time: 8:15 p.m. EST/6:15 p.m. MST
- Game weather: Mostly cloudy, 49 °F (9 °C)
- Game attendance: 70,318
- Referee: Bill Vinovich
- TV announcers (ESPN/ABC): Joe Buck, Troy Aikman and Lisa Salters
- Recap, Game Book

Game information

**First quarter**

- DEN – Wil Lutz 40-yard field goal, 12:39. Broncos 3–0. **Drive: 4 plays, 6 yards, 2:13.**

**Second quarter**

- DEN – Courtland Sutton 7-yard pass from Russell Wilson (kick failed) 3:36. Broncos 9–0. **Drive: 8 plays, 81 yards, 3:41.**
- BUF – Dalton Kincaid 22-yard pass from Josh Allen (Josh Allen–Gabe Davis pass), 7:17. Broncos 9–8. **Drive: 7 plays, 52 yards, 3:53.**
- DEN – Wil Lutz 49-yard field goal, 0:45. Broncos 12–8. **Drive: 8 plays, 45 yards, 2:51.**
- DEN – Wil Lutz 40-yard field goal, 0:00. Broncos 15–8. **Drive: 4 plays, 9 yards, 0:37.**

**Third quarter**

- BUF – Latavius Murray 3-yard run (Tyler Bass kick), 6:42. Tied 15–15. **Drive: 7 plays, 54 yards, 3:09.**

**Fourth quarter**

- DEN – Javonte Williams 3-yard pass from Russell Wilson (run failed), 5:06. Broncos 21–15. **Drive: 12 plays, 54 yards, 7:16.**
- BUF – Josh Allen 6-yard run (Tyler Bass kick), 1:55. Bills 22–21. **Drive: 6 plays, 75 yards, 3:11.**
- DEN – Wil Lutz 36-yard field goal, 0:00. Broncos 24–22. **Drive: 10 plays, 57 yards, 1:55.**

**Top passers**

- DEN – Russell Wilson – 24/29, 193 yards, 2 TD
- BUF – Josh Allen – 15/26, 177 yards, TD, 2 INT

**Top rushers**

- DEN – Javonte Williams – 21 rushes, 79 yards
- BUF – James Cook – 27 rushes, 85 yards

**Top receivers**

- DEN – Courtland Sutton – 8 receptions, 53 yards, TD
- BUF – Dalton Kincaid – 5 receptions, 51 yards, TD

The Broncos' defense forced two turnovers off the Bills' first two possessions—a fumble and an interception off quarterback Josh Allen, but only got one scoring a play—a 40-yard field goal by placekicker Wil Lutz. The Broncos added to their lead midway through the second quarter, with quarterback Russell Wilson completing a pass to wide receiver Courtland Sutton along the side of the end zone that was initially ruled an incomplete pass, but ruled a touchdown after instant replay revealed that Sutton dragged his toes in bounds. However, Lutz hit the left upright on the extra point attempt. The Bills responded, and got on the scoreboard, with Allen connecting on a 22-yard touchdown pass to tight end Dalton Kincaid, with a successful two-point conversion. Lutz added two more field goals—from 49 and 40 yards out, to give the Broncos a 15–8 halftime lead. The latter field goal occurred after another interception of Allen. After an exchange of punts to start the second half, Sutton lost a fumble at the Bills' 45-yard line, and the Bills capitalized, with running back Latavius Murray rushing for a 3-yard touchdown to tie the game midway through the third quarter. After a pair of punt exchanges, the Broncos reclaimed the lead with 5:10 remaining in the game. Wilson connected with running back Javonte Williams for a 3-yard touchdown pass. However, the extra point attempt was botched, leaving the score at 21–15. The Bills then drove down the field, and on the first play after the two-minute warning, Allen scrambled for a 6-yard touchdown run to give the Bills their first lead of the game.

Wilson engineered a comeback that was aided by two crucial penalties on Buffalo. First, the Broncos faced a 3rd-and-10 from the Bills' 45-yard line with 35 seconds left. A pass attempt intended for wide receiver Jerry Jeudy was incomplete, but pass interference was called on Bills' cornerback Taron Johnson at the 17-yard line. Following a quick kneel down, and without any timeouts, the Broncos rushed their field goal unit onto the field. Lutz missed the 41-yard attempt wide right; however, the Bills were flagged for having 12 men on the field, giving Lutz a second chance with only four seconds left. Lutz then redeemed himself—kicking the game-winning 36-yard field goal as time expired.

==== Week 11: vs. Minnesota Vikings ====
Week 11: Minnesota Vikings at Denver Broncos – Game summary

Quarter	1	2	3	4	Total
Vikings	0	10	7	3	**20**
**Broncos**	3	6	0	12	**21**

at Empower Field at Mile High, Denver, Colorado

- Date: November 19
- Game time: 6:15 p.m. MST
- Game weather: Cloudy, 53 °F (12 °C)
- Game attendance: 76,848
- Referee: Ronald Torbert
- TV announcers (NBC): Mike Tirico, Cris Collinsworth and Melissa Stark
- Recap, Game Book

Game information

**First quarter**

- DEN – Wil Lutz 31-yard field goal, 10:28. Broncos 3–0. **Drive: 6 plays, 17 yards, 3:02.**

**Second quarter**

- MIN – Josh Oliver 3-yard pass from Joshua Dobbs (Greg Joseph kick), 14:53. Vikings 7–3. **Drive: 10 plays, 65 yards, 5:08.**
- MIN – Greg Joseph 34-yard field goal, 8:09. Vikings 10–3. **Drive: 9 plays, 55 yards, 5:08.**
- DEN – Wil Lutz 31-yard field goal, 4:08. Vikings 10–6. **Drive: 7 plays, 63 yards, 4:01.**
- DEN – Wil Lutz 52-yard field goal, 0:00. Vikings 10–9. **Drive: 7 plays, 46 yards, 1:11.**

**Third quarter**

- MIN – Joshua Dobbs 10-yard run (Greg Joseph kick), 7:55. Vikings 17–9. **Drive: 9 plays, 69 yards, 4:38.**

**Fourth quarter**

- DEN – Wil Lutz 37-yard field goal, 12:40. Vikings 17–12. **Drive: 9 plays, 47 yards, 5:08.**
- DEN – Wil Lutz 28-yard field goal, 10:37. Vikings 17–15. **Drive: 4 plays, 1 yard, 1:53.**
- MIN – Greg Joseph 30-yard field goal, 3:17. Vikings 20–15. **Drive: 14 plays, 63 yards, 7:20.**
- DEN – Courtland Sutton 15-yard pass from Russell Wilson (run failed), 1:03. Broncos 21–20. **Drive: 10 plays, 75 yards, 2:14.**

**Top passers**

- MIN – Joshua Dobbs – 20/32, 221 yards, TD, INT
- DEN – Russell Wilson – 27/35, 259 yards, TD

**Top rushers**

- MIN – Alexander Mattison – 18 rushes, 81 yards
- DEN – Javonte Williams – 11 rushes, 37 yards

**Top receivers**

- MIN – T. J. Hockenson – 4 receptions, 55 yards
- DEN – Samaje Perine – 7 receptions, 60 yards

The Broncos' offense struggled for most of the game, settling for five field goals by placekicker Wil Lutz through the early portion of the fourth quarter. Each field goal, for the exception of a 52-yarder just before halftime, was the result of the Broncos failing to score a touchdown in the red zone, and three of those field goals occurred after Vikings' turnovers. Defensively, the Broncos yielded two touchdowns to Vikings' quarterback Joshua Dobbs—one passing and one rushing, as well as two field goals by placekicker Greg Joseph. The Broncos trailed 20–15 with 3:20 remaining in the game, when quarterback Russell Wilson engineered a game-winning drive for the second consecutive game—a 10-play, 75-yard drive that culminated in a 15-yard touchdown pass to wide receiver Courtland Sutton in the back of the end zone, with an unsuccessful two-point conversion attempt. The Vikings had one last possession with 1:03 remaining in the game, hoping to reach field goal range. However, after earning one first down at their own 36-yard line, and burning two timeouts in the process, Dobbs threw four consecutive incomplete passes, including a 15-yard intentional grounding penalty on 3rd down, ending the Vikings' rally attempt. With the win, the Broncos earned their first four-game winning streak since 2016.

==== Week 12: vs. Cleveland Browns ====
Week 12: Cleveland Browns at Denver Broncos – Game summary

Quarter	1	2	3	4	Total
Browns	0	6	6	0	**12**
**Broncos**	7	7	3	12	**29**

at Empower Field at Mile High, Denver, Colorado

- Date: November 26
- Game time: 2:05 p.m. MST
- Game weather: Sunny, 40 °F (4 °C)
- Game attendance: 76,261
- Referee: Adrian Hill
- TV announcers (Fox): Kevin Kugler, Mark Sanchez and Laura Okmin
- Recap, Game Book

Game information

**First quarter**

- DEN – Samaje Perine 3-yard run (Wil Lutz kick), 8:14. Broncos 7–0. **Drive: 9 plays, 80 yards, 5:21.**

**Second quarter**

- DEN – Russell Wilson 2-yard run (Wil Lutz kick), 11:11. Broncos 14–0. **Drive: 13 plays, 80 yards, 5:52.**
- CLE – Dustin Hopkins 36-yard field goal, 5:59. Broncos 14–3. **Drive: 13 plays, 57 yards, 5:12.**
- CLE – Dustin Hopkins 24-yard field goal, 0:22. Broncos 14–6. **Drive: 11 plays, 67 yards, 2:42.**

**Third quarter**

- CLE – Harrison Bryant 2-yard pass from Dorian Thompson-Robinson (pass failed), 6:42. Broncos 14–12. **Drive: 13 plays, 79 yards, 6:24.**
- DEN – Wil Lutz 23-yard field goal, 1:25. Broncos 17–12. **Drive: 9 plays, 70 yards, 5:17.**

**Fourth quarter**

- DEN – Adam Trautman 8-yard pass from Russell Wilson (Wil Lutz kick), 13:29. Broncos 24–12. **Drive: 4 plays, 20 yards, 1:25.**
- DEN – Wil Lutz 34-yard field goal, 4:19. Broncos 27–12. **Drive: 7 plays, 42 yards, 4:05.**
- DEN – P. J. Walker sacked in the end zone by Zach Allen for a safety, 2:19. Broncos 29–12.

**Top passers**

- CLE – Dorian Thompson-Robinson – 14/29, 134 yards, TD
- DEN – Russell Wilson – 13/22, 134 yards, TD

**Top rushers**

- CLE – Jerome Ford – 9 rushes, 75 yards
- DEN – Javonte Williams – 18 rushes, 65 yards

**Top receivers**

- CLE – David Njoku – 6 receptions, 59 yards
- DEN – Courtland Sutton – 3 receptions, 61 yards

After achieving only one rushing touchdown the entire season, the Broncos jumped out to a 14–0 lead on a pair of rushing touchdowns—a 3-yarder by running back Samaje Perine in the first quarter, followed in the second quarter by a 2-yarder by quarterback Russell Wilson. The Browns then scored 12 unanswered points—two field goals by placekicker Dustin Hopkins late in the second quarter, followed by a 2-yard touchdown pass from quarterback Dorian Thompson-Robinson to tight end Harrison Bryant midway through the third quarter. Wide receiver Amari Cooper dropped what would have been the game-tying two point conversion in the end zone. However, the Broncos' defense held the Browns scoreless for the remainder of the game, and the Broncos added 15 more points—two short field goals by placekicker Wil Lutz, an 8-yard touchdown pass from Wilson to tight end Adam Trautman, and Broncos defensive end Zach Allen sacked Browns' backup quarterback P. J. Walker in the end zone for a safety. With the win, the Broncos earned their first five-game winning streak since their 2015 Super Bowl-winning season.

==== Week 13: at Houston Texans ====
Week 13: Denver Broncos at Houston Texans – Game summary

Quarter	1	2	3	4	Total
Broncos	0	3	7	7	**17**
**Texans**	10	3	3	6	**22**

at NRG Stadium, Houston, Texas

- Date: December 3
- Game time: 12:00 p.m. CST/11:00 a.m. MST
- Game weather: None (retractable roof closed)
- Game attendance: 71,670
- Referee: Shawn Smith
- TV announcers (CBS): Ian Eagle, Charles Davis and Evan Washburn
- Recap, Game Book

Game information

**First quarter**

- HOU – Matt Ammendola 29-yard field goal, 10:11. Texans 3–0. **Drive: 5 plays, 36 yards, 2:03.**
- HOU – Dameon Pierce 3-yard run (Matt Ammendola kick), 3:49. Texans 10–0. **Drive: 10 plays, 78 yards, 4:22.**

**Second quarter**

- HOU – Matt Ammendola 38-yard field goal, 12:54. Texans 13–0. **Drive: 7 plays, 69 yards, 3:12.**
- DEN – Wil Lutz 34-yard field goal, 1:24. Texans 13–3. **Drive: 13 plays, 56 yards, 5:09.**

**Third quarter**

- HOU – Matt Ammendola 38-yard field goal, 8:51. Texans 16–3. **Drive: 7 plays, 40 yards, 4:02.**
- DEN – Courtland Sutton 45-yard pass from Russell Wilson (Wil Lutz kick), 4:47. Texans 16–10. **Drive: 3 plays, 58 yards, 1:20.**

**Fourth quarter**

- HOU – Nico Collins 3-yard pass from C. J. Stroud (pass failed), 14:16. Texans 22–10. **Drive: 4 plays, 21 yards, 1:43.**
- DEN – Russell Wilson 1-yard run (Wil Lutz kick), 12:04. Texans 22–17. **Drive: 5 plays, 75 yards, 2:12.**

**Top passers**

- DEN – Russell Wilson – 15/26, 186 yards, TD, 3 INT
- HOU – C. J. Stroud – 16/27, 274 yards, TD

**Top rushers**

- DEN – Javonte Williams – 13 rushes, 46 yards
- HOU – Dameon Pierce – 15 rushes, 41 yards, TD

**Top receivers**

- DEN – Jerry Jeudy – 3 receptions, 51 yards
- HOU – Nico Collins – 9 receptions, 191 yards, TD

The Broncos' offense struggled throughout the first three quarters of the game, only managing a 34-yard field goal by placekicker Wil Lutz late in the second quarter. The Broncos failed to advance past midfield on 6 of their first 7 possessions, excluding a kneel down just before halftime. The Broncos trailed 16–3 after three field goals by Texans' placekicker Matt Ammendola and a 3-yard touchdown run by running back Dameon Pierce. The latter occurred after a personal foul on Broncos' linebacker Alex Singleton on Texans' quarterback C. J. Stroud negated a false start on 4th-and-goal. The Broncos finally reached the end zone late in the third quarter, with quarterback Russell Wilson connecting on a 45-yard touchdown pass to wide receiver Courtland Sutton. After forcing a Texans' punt, Wilson was intercepted by cornerback Derek Stingley Jr. deep in Broncos' territory, giving the Texans a short field. The Texans took advantage of the turnover and added to their lead, with a 3-yard touchdown pass from Stroud to wide receiver Nico Collins on the second play of the fourth quarter, with an unsuccessful two-point conversion attempt. The Broncos responded, with a 5-play, 75-yard drive, culminating in a 1-yard touchdown run by Wilson to narrow the Texans' lead to 22–17. After forcing a Texans' punt, Wilson was intercepted again by Stingley, this one at the Texans' 27-yard line. After forcing one more Texans' punt, the Broncos had one more possession at their own 20-yard line at the 4:36 mark of the fourth quarter. With only 23 seconds remaining and no timeouts, the Broncos faced a 1st-and-goal at the Texans' 8-yard line after two successful 4th-down conversions. However, after two incomplete passes, Wilson's pass intended for tight end Lucas Krull was intercepted by Texans' safety Jimmie Ward in the end zone for a touchback.

==== Week 14: at Los Angeles Chargers ====
Week 14: Denver Broncos at Los Angeles Chargers – Game summary

Quarter	1	2	3	4	Total
**Broncos**	7	3	7	7	**24**
Chargers	0	0	0	7	**7**

at SoFi Stadium, Inglewood, California

- Date: December 10
- Game time: 2:25 p.m. MST/1:25 p.m. PST
- Game weather: Clear, 75 °F (24 °C) (retractable roof open)
- Game attendance: 70,240
- Referee: Clete Blakeman
- TV announcers (CBS): Andrew Catalon, Tiki Barber, Matt Ryan and AJ Ross
- Recap, Game Book

Game information

**First quarter**

- DEN – Javonte Williams 3-yard run (Wil Lutz kick), 4:55. Broncos 7–0. **Drive: 1 play, 3 yards, 0:05.**

**Second quarter**

- DEN – Wil Lutz 23-yard field goal, 0:05. Broncos 10–0. **Drive: 10 plays, 65 yards, 1:23.**

**Third quarter**

- DEN – Courtland Sutton 46-yard pass from Russell Wilson (Wil Lutz kick), 5:55. Broncos 17–0. **Drive: 4 plays, 60 yards, 2:12.**

**Fourth quarter**

- LAC – Austin Ekeler 3-yard run (Cameron Dicker kick), 10:37. Broncos 17–7. **Drive: 5 plays, 94 yards, 1:44.**
- DEN – Adam Trautman 10-yard pass from Russell Wilson (Wil Lutz kick), 3:11. Broncos 24–7. **Drive: 13 plays, 75 yards, 7:26.**

**Top passers**

- DEN – Russell Wilson – 21/33, 224 yards, 2 TD, INT
- LAC – Easton Stick – 13/24, 179 yards

**Top rushers**

- DEN – Javonte Williams – 17 rushes, 66 yards, TD
- LAC – Austin Ekeler – 10 rushes, 51 yards, TD

**Top receivers**

- DEN – Courtland Sutton – 3 receptions, 62 yards, TD
- LAC – Quentin Johnston – 3 receptions, 91 yards

The Broncos' defense dominated the game, holding the Chargers to 0-for-12 on 3rd down and 1-of-6 on 4th down with two turnovers. The Chargers were unable to take advantage of an early interception of Russell Wilson deep in Broncos' territory, failing on a 4th-and-3 instead of kicking a field goal at the 6-yard line. The Broncos took advantage of an interception of Chargers' quarterback Justin Herbert, with a 3-yard touchdown run by running back Javonte Williams, and added a 23-yard field goal by placekicker Wil Lutz just before halftime. Herbert exited the game in the second quarter with a finger injury, and was replaced by backup quarterback Easton Stick for the remainder of the game. The Broncos added to their lead in the third quarter, with Wilson connecting on a 46-yard touchdown pass to wide receiver Courtland Sutton. After a 3-yard touchdown run by Chargers' running back Austin Ekeler narrowed the Broncos' lead to 17–7 early in the fourth quarter, the Broncos put the game out of reach, with a 10-yard touchdown pass from Wilson to tight end Adam Trautman. With the win, the Broncos snapped an 11-game road losing streak against their AFC West opponents.

==== Week 15: at Detroit Lions ====
Week 15: Denver Broncos at Detroit Lions – Game summary

Quarter	1	2	3	4	Total
Broncos	0	0	10	7	**17**
**Lions**	0	21	7	14	**42**

at Ford Field, Detroit, Michigan

- Date: December 16
- Game time: 8:15 p.m. EST/6:15 p.m. MST
- Game weather: None (indoor stadium)
- Game attendance: 64,560
- Referee: John Hussey
- TV announcers (KMGH/NFLN): Kevin Harlan, Trent Green and Melanie Collins
- Recap, Game Book

Game information

**First quarter**

- No scoring plays.

**Second quarter**

- DET – Sam LaPorta 19-yard pass from Jared Goff (Michael Badgley kick), 12:31. Lions 7–0. **Drive: 8 plays, 80 yards, 4:07.**
- DET – Jahmyr Gibbs 9-yard pass from Jared Goff (Michael Badgley kick), 8:15. Lions 14–0. **Drive: 6 plays, 61 yards, 2:43.**
- DET – Amon-Ra St. Brown 15-yard pass from Jared Goff (Michael Badgley kick), 0:19. Lions 21–0. **Drive: 11 plays, 81 yards, 4:02.**

**Third quarter**

- DEN – Lil'Jordan Humphrey 3-yard pass from Russell Wilson (Wil Lutz kick), 10:41. Lions 21–7. **Drive: 10 plays, 75 yards, 4:26.**
- DET – Sam LaPorta 3-yard pass from Jared Goff (Michael Badgley kick), 7:01. Lions 28–7. **Drive: 8 plays, 75 yards, 3:33.**
- DEN – Wil Lutz 23-yard field goal, 0:43. Lions 28–10. **Drive: 12 plays, 70 yards, 6:18.**

**Fourth quarter**

- DET – Jahmyr Gibbs 12-yard run (Michael Badgley kick), 12:12. Lions 35–10. **Drive: 6 plays, 75 yards, 3:31.**
- DEN – Russell Wilson 1-yard run (Wil Lutz kick), 6:28. Lions 35–17. **Drive: 8 plays, 62 yards, 2:50.**
- DET – Sam LaPorta 10-yard pass from Jared Goff (Michael Badgley kick), 2:21. Lions 42–17. **Drive: 8 plays, 44 yards, 4:07.**

**Top passers**

- DEN – Russell Wilson – 18/32, 223 yards, TD
- DET – Jared Goff – 24/34, 278 yards, 5 TD

**Top rushers**

- DEN – Samaje Perine – 6 rushes, 37 yards
- DET – Jahmyr Gibbs – 11 rushes, 100 yards, TD

**Top receivers**

- DEN – Jerry Jeudy – 3 receptions, 74 yards
- DET – Amon-Ra St. Brown – 7 receptions, 112 yards, TD

The Broncos' offense struggled in the first half and never recovered from a 21–0 halftime deficit, in a 42–17 loss to the Lions. The Broncos' defense surrendered five touchdown passes to Lions' quarterback Jared Goff and one rushing touchdown to running back Jahmyr Gibbs. On the offensive side of the football, quarterback Russell Wilson threw for one touchdown and ran for another, and placekicker Wil Lutz added a 23-yard field goal, but the Broncos never got any closer than an 18-point deficit in the second half.

==== Week 16: vs. New England Patriots ====
Week 16: New England Patriots at Denver Broncos – Game summary

Quarter	1	2	3	4	Total
**Patriots**	0	3	20	3	**26**
Broncos	7	0	0	16	**23**

at Empower Field at Mile High, Denver, Colorado

- Date: December 24
- Game time: 6:15 p.m. MST
- Game weather: Mostly cloudy, 28 °F (−2 °C)
- Game attendance: 76,201
- Referee: Carl Cheffers
- TV announcers (KMGH/NFLN): Rich Eisen, Kurt Warner, James Palmer and Sherree Burruss
- Recap, Game Book

Game information

**First quarter**

- DEN – Javonte Williams 3-yard run (Wil Lutz kick), 5:15. Broncos 7–0. **Drive: 5 plays, 25 yards, 2:46.**

**Second quarter**

- NE – Chad Ryland 33-yard field goal, 13:30. Broncos 7–3. **Drive: 13 plays, 61 yards, 6:45.**

**Third quarter**

- NE – Ezekiel Elliott 15-yard pass from Bailey Zappe (kick failed), 9:54. Patriots 9–7. **Drive: 5 plays, 70 yards, 2:56.**
- NE – Mike Gesicki 11-yard pass from Bailey Zappe (Chad Ryland kick), 1:34. Patriots 16–7. **Drive: 5 plays, 42 yards, 2:54.**
- NE – Cody Davis 1-yard fumble return (Chad Ryland kick), 1:28. Patriots 23–7.

**Fourth quarter**

- DEN – Lucas Krull 3-yard pass from Russell Wilson (Russell Wilson–Brandon Johnson pass), 8:33. Patriots 23–15. **Drive: 9 plays, 83 yards, 4:38.**
- DEN – Brandon Johnson 21-yard pass from Russell Wilson (Russell Wilson–Javonte Williams pass), 2:53. Tied 23–23. **Drive: 11 plays, 78 yards, 3:40.**
- NE – Chad Ryland 56-yard field goal, 0:07. Patriots 26–23. **Drive: 7 plays, 43 yards, 0:56.**

**Top passers**

- NE – Bailey Zappe – 25/33, 256 yards, 2 TD
- DEN – Russell Wilson – 25/37, 238 yards, 2 TD

**Top rushers**

- NE – Ezekiel Elliot – 12 rushes, 27 yards
- DEN – Jaleel McLaughlin – 6 rushes, 37 yards

**Top receivers**

- NE – Demario Douglas – 5 receptions, 74 yards
- DEN – Marvin Mims – 3 receptions, 63 yards

All three of the Broncos' first three possessions started in Patriots' territory—at the 6-, 46- and 25-yard lines; however, the Broncos were only able to achieve one scoring play—a 3-yard touchdown run by running back Javonte Williams. After forcing a strip sack and fumble off Patriots' quarterback Bailey Zappe on the game's first play from scrimmage, the Broncos failed to capitalize on a 4th-and-goal from the 2-yard line and only gained four yards after starting at the 46-yard line. After a 33-yard field goal by Patriots' placekicker Chad Ryland early in the second quarter, the Broncos reached the Patriots' 38-yard line, only for Williams to commit a fumble, ending the drive. Both placekickers—Ryland and the Broncos' Wil Lutz, missed long field goal attempts after the two-minute warning, leaving the score at 7–3 in favor of the Broncos at halftime. In the third quarter, the Broncos' offense struggled, with quarterback Russell Wilson being sacked four times, the defense surrendered 20 unanswered points. First, Zappe connected on two touchdown passes—a 15-yarder to running back Ezekiel Elliott (with a missed extra point attempt), followed by an 11-yarder to tight end Mike Gesicki. The Broncos were victimized by a disastrous play on the kickoff following the latter touchdown, as return specialist Marvin Mims fumbled near the goal line, and safety Cody Davis scooped up the football for a 1-yard touchdown to give the Patriots a 23–7 lead. After a poor offensive performance for most of the game, Wilson threw two touchdown passes in the fourth quarter—a 3-yarder to tight end Lucas Krull, followed by a 21-yarder to wide receiver Brandon Johnson—both with successful two-point conversions, to tie the game at 23–23 with only three minutes remaining in the game. After forcing a Patriots' punt, the Broncos' offense went three-and-out, giving the Patriots the football at their own 19-yard line with 58 seconds remaining in the game. However, after the Broncos called two timeouts on defense, the Patriots marched down the field, culminating in a 56-yard game-winning field goal by Ryland in the final seconds.

==== Week 17: vs. Los Angeles Chargers ====
Week 17: Los Angeles Chargers at Denver Broncos – Game summary

Quarter	1	2	3	4	Total
Chargers	0	3	3	3	**9**
**Broncos**	3	10	0	3	**16**

at Empower Field at Mile High, Denver, Colorado

- Date: December 31
- Game time: 2:25 p.m. MST
- Game weather: Mostly cloudy, 41 °F (5 °C)
- Game attendance: 76,228
- Referee: Craig Wrolstad
- TV announcers (CBS): Tom McCarthy, James Lofton, Jay Feely and Tiffany Blackmon
- Recap, Game Book

Game information

**First quarter**

- DEN – Wil Lutz 32-yard field goal, 3:55. Broncos 3–0. **Drive: 11 plays, 53 yards, 5:49.**

**Second quarter**

- LAC – Cameron Dicker 36-yard field goal, 9:43. Tied 3–3. **Drive: 8 plays, 42 yards, 3:32.**
- DEN – Lil'Jordan Humphrey 54-yard pass from Jarrett Stidham (Wil Lutz kick), 6:37. Broncos 10–3. **Drive: 6 plays, 75 yards, 3:06.**
- DEN – Wil Lutz 43-yard field goal, 1:53. Broncos 13–3. **Drive: 6 plays, 17 yards, 0:58.**

**Third quarter**

- LAC – Cameron Dicker 50-yard field goal, 6:20. Broncos 13–6. **Drive: 9 plays, 58 yards, 4:27.**

**Fourth quarter**

- DEN – Wil Lutz 20-yard field goal, 11:19. Broncos 16–6. **Drive: 7 plays, 36 yards, 3:34.**
- LAC – Cameron Dicker 52-yard field goal, 1:17. Broncos 16–9. **Drive: 9 plays, 46 yards, 1:42.**

**Top passers**

- LAC – Easton Stick – 24/38, 220 yards
- DEN – Jarrett Stidham – 20/32, 224 yards, TD

**Top rushers**

- LAC – Austin Ekeler – 13 rushes, 46 yards
- DEN – Jaleel McLaughlin – 8 rushes, 44 yards

**Top receivers**

- LAC – Alex Erickson – 7 receptions, 98 yards
- DEN – Brandon Johnson – 4 receptions, 27 yards

Each placekicker exchanged field goals—a 32-yarder by the Broncos' Wil Lutz in the first quarter, followed in the second quarter by a 36-yarder by the Chargers' Cameron Dicker. Broncos' backup quarter Jarrett Stidham, playing in place of the benched Russell Wilson, connected on a 54-yard pass to wide receiver Lil'Jordan Humphrey for the game's only touchdown. Lutz added a 43-yard field goal just after the two-minute warning, but missed wide-right on a 48-yard attempt in the final seconds of the first half, for a 13–3 Broncos' halftime lead. A 50-yard field goal by Dicker was the only scoring play of the third quarter, and Lutz countered with a 20-yarder early in the fourth quarter. A 52-yard field goal by Dicker narrowed the Broncos' lead to 13–6 with only 1:21 remaining in the game. The Chargers' onside kick attempt was unsuccessful, sealing the Broncos' win, and their first season sweep of the Chargers since 2019. However, the Broncos were eliminated from postseason contention after the Pittsburgh Steelers and Kansas City Chiefs both won their respective games, which extended their playoff drought to eight seasons dating back to 2016.

==== Week 18: at Las Vegas Raiders ====
Week 18: Denver Broncos at Las Vegas Raiders – Game summary

Quarter	1	2	3	4	Total
Broncos	0	7	0	7	**14**
**Raiders**	7	10	0	10	**27**

at Allegiant Stadium, Paradise, Nevada

- Date: January 7
- Game time: 2:25 p.m. MST/1:25 p.m. PST
- Game weather: None (indoor stadium)
- Game attendance: 61,429
- Referee: Shawn Hochuli
- TV announcers (Fox): Jason Benetti, Matt Millen and Megan Olivi
- Recap, Game Book

Game information

**First quarter**

- LV – Jakobi Meyers 5-yard run (Daniel Carlson kick), 1:44. Raiders 7–0. **Drive: 13 plays, 78 yards, 8:03.**

**Second quarter**

- DEN – Jerry Jeudy 24-yard pass from Jarrett Stidham (Wil Lutz kick), 10:34. Tied 7–7. **Drive: 11 plays, 84 yards, 6:10.**
- LV – Daniel Carlson 49-yard field goal, 7:09. Raiders 10–7. **Drive: 8 plays, 44 yards, 3:25.**
- LV – Davante Adams 3-yard pass from Aidan O'Connell (Daniel Carlson kick), 0:07. Raiders 17–7. **Drive: 12 plays, 98 yards, 1:36.**

**Third quarter**

- No scoring plays.

**Fourth quarter**

- LV – Jakobi Meyers 33-yard pass from Aidan O'Connell (Daniel Carlson kick), 14:53. Raiders 24–7. **Drive: 6 plays, 63 yards, 3:32.**
- DEN – Javonte Williams 2-yard run (Wil Lutz kick), 10:09. Broncos 24–14. **Drive: 8 plays, 75 yards, 4:44.**
- LV – Daniel Carlson 21-yard field goal, 2:20. Broncos 27–14. **Drive: 15 plays, 72 yards, 7:49.**

**Top passers**

- DEN – Jarrett Stidham – 20/34, 272 yards, TD, INT
- LV – Aidan O'Connell – 20/31, 244 yards, 2 TD

**Top rushers**

- DEN – Javonte Williams – 9 rushes, 32 yards, TD
- LV – Zamir White – 25 rushes, 112 yards

**Top receivers**

- DEN – Javonte Williams – 7 receptions, 43 yards
- LV – Tre Tucker – 5 receptions, 79 yards

In the Broncos' season finale, the Raiders took the early lead, with wide receiver Jakobi Meyers running for a 5-yard touchdown. The Broncos responded early in the second quarter, with quarterback Jarrett Stidham connecting on a 24-yard touchdown pass to wide receiver Jerry Jeudy. The Raiders then scored 17 unanswered points, starting with a 49-yard field goal by placekicker Daniel Carlson and a 3-yard touchdown pass from quarterback Aidan O'Connell to wide receiver Davante Adams before halftime. After a scoreless third quarter, O'Connell connected on a 33-yard touchdown pass to Meyers, for a 24–7 Raiders' lead. The Broncos' offense struggled after their initial scoring play, failing to advance past midfield on three possessions (excluding a kneel down before halftime), and turning the football over on down at the Raiders' 36-yard line on a 4th-and-3. The Broncos narrowed the Raiders' lead at the 10-minute mark of the fourth quarter, with running back Javonte Williams rushing for a 2-yard touchdown on a direct snap. However, the Broncos' defense was unable to prevent the Raiders from going on a 15-play, 72-yard drive that devoured nearly eight minutes, culminating in a 21-yard field goal by Carlson with 2:23 remaining in the game. The Broncos attempted a rally, but six plays into their final possession, Stidham was intercepted at the Raiders' 18-yard line with only one minute remaining in the game. W

As of 2025, this remains the last time the Broncos had lost to the Raiders, along with being their most recent losing season.

=== Standings ===
==== Division ====
AFC West
	W	L	T	PCT	DIV	CONF	PF	PA	STK
^{(3)} Kansas City Chiefs	11	6	0	.647	4–2	9–3	371	294	W2
Las Vegas Raiders	8	9	0	.471	4–2	6–6	332	331	W1
Denver Broncos	8	9	0	.471	3–3	5–7	357	413	L1
Los Angeles Chargers	5	12	0	.294	1–5	3–9	346	398	L5

==== Conference ====
AFC
#	Team	Division	W	L	T	PCT	DIV	CONF	SOS	SOV	STK
**Division leaders**
1	Baltimore Ravens	North	13	4	0	.765	3–3	8–4	.543	.529	L1
2 (Note: Buffalo claimed the No. 2 seed over Kansas City based on head-to-head victory.) (Note: Buffalo finished ahead of Miami in the AFC East based on head-to-head sweep.)	Buffalo Bills	East	11	6	0	.647	4–2	7–5	.471	.471	W5
3	Kansas City Chiefs	West	11	6	0	.647	4–2	9–3	.481	.428	W2
4	Houston Texans	South	10	7	0	.588	4–2	7–5	.474	.465	W2
**Wild cards**
5 (Note: Cleveland claimed the No. 5 seed over Miami based on conference record.)	Cleveland Browns	North	11	6	0	.647	3–3	8–4	.536	.513	L1
6	Miami Dolphins	East	11	6	0	.647	4–2	7–5	.450	.358	L2
7	Pittsburgh Steelers	North	10	7	0	.588	5–1	7–5	.540	.571	W3
**Did not qualify for the postseason**
8 (Note: Cincinnati finished ahead of Jacksonville based on head-to-head victory. Division tie break was initially used to eliminate Indianapolis (see below).)	Cincinnati Bengals	North	9	8	0	.529	1–5	4–8	.574	.536	W1
9 (Note: Jacksonville finished ahead of Indianapolis based on head-to-head sweep.)	Jacksonville Jaguars	South	9	8	0	.529	4–2	6–6	.533	.477	L1
10	Indianapolis Colts	South	9	8	0	.529	3–3	7–5	.491	.444	L1
11 (Note: Las Vegas finished ahead of Denver based on head-to-head sweep.)	Las Vegas Raiders	West	8	9	0	.471	4–2	6–6	.488	.426	W1
12	Denver Broncos	West	8	9	0	.471	3–3	5–7	.488	.485	L1
13	New York Jets	East	7	10	0	.412	2–4	4–8	.502	.454	W1
14	Tennessee Titans	South	6	11	0	.353	1–5	4–8	.522	.422	W1
15	Los Angeles Chargers	West	5	12	0	.294	1–5	3–9	.529	.388	L5
16	New England Patriots	East	4	13	0	.235	2–4	4–8	.522	.529	L2
**Tiebreakers** (Note: When breaking ties for three or more teams under the NFL's rules, they are first broken within divisions, then comparing only the highest ranked remaining team from each division.)

=== Statistics ===
==== Team leaders ====
Category	Player(s)	Value
Passing yards	Russell Wilson	3,070
Passing touchdowns	Russell Wilson	26
Rushing yards	Javonte Williams	774
Rushing touchdowns	Russell Wilson; Javonte Williams	3
Receptions	Courtland Sutton	59
Receiving yards	Courtland Sutton	772
Receiving touchdowns	Courtland Sutton	10
Points	Wil Lutz	119
Kickoff return yards	Marvin Mims	397
Punt return yards	Marvin Mims	312
Tackles	Alex Singleton	177
Sacks	Jonathon Cooper	8.5
Forced fumbles	D. J. Jones	3
Interceptions	Justin Simmons	3

Source for this section: Denver Broncos' official website.

==== League rankings ====
Offense
Category	Value	NFL rank (out of 32)
Total yards	298.4 YPG	26th
Yards per play	5.0	T–22nd
Rushing yards	106.5 YPG	18th
Yards per rush	4.0	T–21st
Passing yards	191.9 YPG	24th
Yards per pass	7.0	T–17th
Pass completions	337/513 (.657)	12th
Total touchdowns	38	19th
Rushing touchdowns	8	T–28th
Receiving touchdowns	28	T–8th
Scoring	21.0 PPG	19th
Red Zone Touchdowns	30/58 (.517)	19th
Third down efficiency	81/220 (.368)	21st
Fourth down efficiency	13/20 (.650)	3rd
First downs per game	17.7	24th
Fewest sacks allowed	52	27th
Fewest giveaways	22	T–17th
Fewest penalties	99	T–18th
Least penalty yardage	749	12th

Defense
Category	Value	NFL rank (out of 32)
Total yards	370.8 YPG	29th
Yards per play	5.8	30th
Rushing yards	137.1 YPG	30th
Yards per rush	5.0	32nd
Passing yards	233.6 YPG	22nd
Yards per pass	7.5	T–25th
Pass completions	382/572 (.668)	27th
Total touchdowns	46	T–24th
Rushing touchdowns	15	T–17th
Receiving touchdowns	29	T–28th
Scoring	24.3 PPG	27th
Red Zone Touchdowns	34/59 (.576)	22nd
Third down efficiency	67/202 (.332)	2nd
Fourth down efficiency	16/34 (.471)	12th
First downs per game	20.5	26th
Sacks	42	T–21st
Takeaways	26	T–12th
Fewest penalties	99	T–16th
Least penalty yardage	965	31st

Special teams
Category	Value	NFL rank (out of 32)
Gross punting	46.3 YPP	22nd
Net punting	41.5 YPP	16th
Kickoffs	63.3 YPK	16th
Punt returns	16.3 YPR	1st
Kick returns	24.9 YPR	8th
Punt coverage	6.3 YPR	2nd
Kick coverage	21.5	9th

Source for this section: Pro-Football Reference.

=== Starters ===
Position	Player	Age	Years pro	Starts
Offense
QB	Russell Wilson	35	11	15
RB	Javonte Williams	23	2	13
WR	Courtland Sutton	28	5	14
WR	Jerry Jeudy	24	3	11
WR	Marvin Mims	21	Rookie	7
TE	Adam Trautman	26	3	12
LT	Garett Bolles	31	6	17
LG	Ben Powers	27	4	17
C	Lloyd Cushenberry	26	3	17
RG	Quinn Meinerz	25	2	17
RT	Mike McGlinchey	29	5	16
Defense
LDE	Zach Allen	26	4	17
NT	Mike Purcell	32	9	10
RDE	D. J. Jones	28	6	16
LOLB	Baron Browning	24	2	9
LILB	Alex Singleton	30	4	16
RILB	Josey Jewell	29	5	15
ROLB	Jonathon Cooper	25	2	17
LCB	Patrick Surtain II	23	2	17
SS	Kareem Jackson	35	13	8
FS	Justin Simmons	30	7	15
RCB	Fabian Moreau	29	6	11

Source for this section: Pro-Football Reference.

=== Captains ===
Position	Player	Times captain
Offense
QB	Russell Wilson	2
WR	Courtland Sutton	3
T	Mike McGlinchey	1
Defense
S	Kareem Jackson	3
S	Justin Simmons	3
Special Teams
P	Riley Dixon	1

Source for this section: Denver Broncos.

== Awards and honors ==
Recipient	Award(s)
Justin Simmons	Week 8: AFC Defensive Player of the Week
Marvin Mims	Week 10: AFC Special Teams Player of the Week
Wil Lutz	November: AFC Special Teams Player of the Month

=== Pro Bowl and All-Pro selections ===
On January 3, 2024, cornerback Patrick Surtain II, safety Justin Simmons and return specialist Marvin Mims were named starters for the 2024 Pro Bowl Games. On January 9, fullback Michael Burton was named as a PFF first-team All-Pro selection, and one day later (January 10), Surtain was selected to the second annual NFLPA Players' All-Pro team. On January 12, Mims and Simmons were selected as second-team All-Pros.
