= Devon Key =

American football player (born 1997)

No. 26 – Denver Broncos
- Positions: Free safety, special teamer
- Roster status: Active

Personal information
- Born: October 28, 1997 (age 29); Lexington, Kentucky, U.S.
- Listed height: 6 ft 0 in (1.83 m)
- Listed weight: 208 lb (94 kg)

Career information
- High school: Bryan Station (Lexington)
- College: Western Kentucky (2016–2020)
- NFL draft: 2021: undrafted

Career history
- Kansas City Chiefs (2021)*; Atlanta Falcons (2022)*; Denver Broncos (2022–present)
- * Offseason or practice squad member only

Awards and highlights
- First-team All-Pro (2025); Second-team All-CUSA (2020)

Career NFL statistics as of 2025
- Total tackles: 61
- Sacks: 1
- Forced fumbles: 1
- Pass deflections: 1
- Stats at Pro Football Reference

Devon Key (born October 28, 1997) is an American professional football free safety and special teamer for the Denver Broncos of the National Football League (NFL). He played college football for the Western Kentucky Hilltoppers and was signed by the Kansas City Chiefs as an undrafted free agent following the 2021 NFL draft.

== Early life and education ==
Devon Key was born on October 28, 1997, in Lexington, Kentucky. He attended Bryan Station High School, playing on offense and defense. He was rated a two-star prospect by Rivals.com, 247sports.com, and Scout.com. Following his senior year of high school Key accepted a scholarship offer from Western Kentucky University, spending his first year of 2016 as a redshirt.

As a redshirt-freshman the following year, Key was starting safety to begin the season, making 94 tackles (44 solo, 50 assisted) to rank second on his team and 16th in the conference. He recorded at least nine tackles in five different games. He made his first-career interception in the end zone on November 11 at Marshall. He had a career-high 12 tackles on September 9 at Illinois.

He started all 12 games as a sophomore, compiling 71 tackles to lead the team's defensive backs. He also recorded a team-leading three interceptions. His first interception, against Maine, was returned for a 45-yard touchdown. Key also made interceptions during the final two season games. Following the season he was named All-Conference USA honorable mention.

Key started 13 games as a junior, making 93 tackles, third on the team. He recorded his second career interception return touchdown against Arkansas in November. He again was named All-Conference USA honorable mention. He again started every game during his senior season, breaking the FBS-era team record for career tackles, with 350. He finished the year with 92 tackles, one less than the previous year. He was named second-team All-Conference USA following the season.

== Professional career ==
Pre-draft measurables
Height	Weight	Arm length	Hand span	Wingspan	40-yard dash	10-yard split	20-yard split	20-yard shuttle	Three-cone drill	Vertical jump	Broad jump	Bench press
5 ft 11 5/8 in (1.82 m)	208 lb (94 kg)	30 3/4 in (0.78 m)	9 1/4 in (0.23 m)	6 ft 3 1/4 in (1.91 m)	4.56 s	1.57 s	2.57 s	4.15 s	7.13 s	38.0 in (0.97 m)	10 ft 3 in (3.12 m)	20 reps
All values from Pro Day

=== Kansas City Chiefs ===
After going unselected in the 2021 NFL draft, Key was signed by the Kansas City Chiefs as an undrafted free agent. He was released at roster cuts and signed to the practice squad the next day. He signed a reserve/future contract with the Chiefs on February 2, 2022.

On August 30, 2022, Key was waived by the Chiefs.

=== Atlanta Falcons ===
On November 15, 2022, Key was signed to the Atlanta Falcons' practice squad. He was released from the practice squad a week later.

=== Denver Broncos ===
On December 20, 2022, Key was signed to the Denver Broncos' practice squad. He signed a reserve/future contract with Denver on January 9, 2023.

On August 29, 2023, Key was waived by the Broncos and re-signed to the practice squad. He signed a reserve/future contract with Denver on January 8, 2024.

Key made the Broncos 53-man roster to start the 2024 season. He played in his first NFL game week 1 against the Seattle Seahawks and made his first career start week 9 against the Baltimore Ravens filling in for an injured Brandon Jones. Serving as the Broncos second-string free safety and a core special teamer, Key recorded 33 tackles and a sack in over the course of the season.

On March 4, 2025, the Broncos assigned his exclusive-rights free agent tender, keeping him under contract through the 2025 season. After a standout season as a special teams ace in 2025, Key was named a first-team All-Pro.

On March 6, 2026, the Broncos once again assigned his ERFA tender worth $1.075 million.

== NFL career statistics ==
Legend
**Bold**	Career high

=== Regular season ===
Year	Team	Games		Tackles					Interceptions						Fumbles				
Year	Team	GP	GS	Cmb	Solo	Ast	Sck	TFL	Int	Yds	Avg	Lng	TD	PD	FF	Fum	FR	Yds	TD
2023	DEN	1	0	0	0	0	0.0	0	0	0	0.0	0	0	0	0	0	0	0	0
2024	DEN	**17**	**2**	**33**	17	**16**	**1.0**	**1**	0	0	0.0	0	0	0	0	0	0	0	0
2025	DEN	**17**	0	28	**19**	9	0.0	0	0	0	0.0	0	0	**1**	**1**	0	0	0	0
Career		35	2	61	36	25	1.0	1	0	0	0.0	0	0	1	1	0	0	0	0

=== Postseason ===
Year	Team	Games		Tackles					Interceptions						Fumbles				
Year	Team	GP	GS	Cmb	Solo	Ast	Sck	TFL	Int	Yds	Avg	Lng	TD	PD	FF	Fum	FR	Yds	TD
2024	DEN	1	0	0	0	0	0.0	0	0	0	0.0	0	0	0	0	0	0	0	0
2025	DEN	**2**	0	**6**	**6**	0	0.0	0	0	0	0.0	0	0	0	0	0	**1**	**3**	0
Career		3	0	6	6	0	0.0	0	0	0	0.0	0	0	0	0	0	1	3	0

== Personal life ==
Key's father, Donte, played for the University of Kentucky. His younger brother, Dane, formerly played as a wide receiver at the University of Kentucky and also currently plays for the Broncos. Key and his girlfriend had a son in August 2020 and they have since had another child.
