= P. J. Locke =

American football player (born 1997)

P. J. Locke III
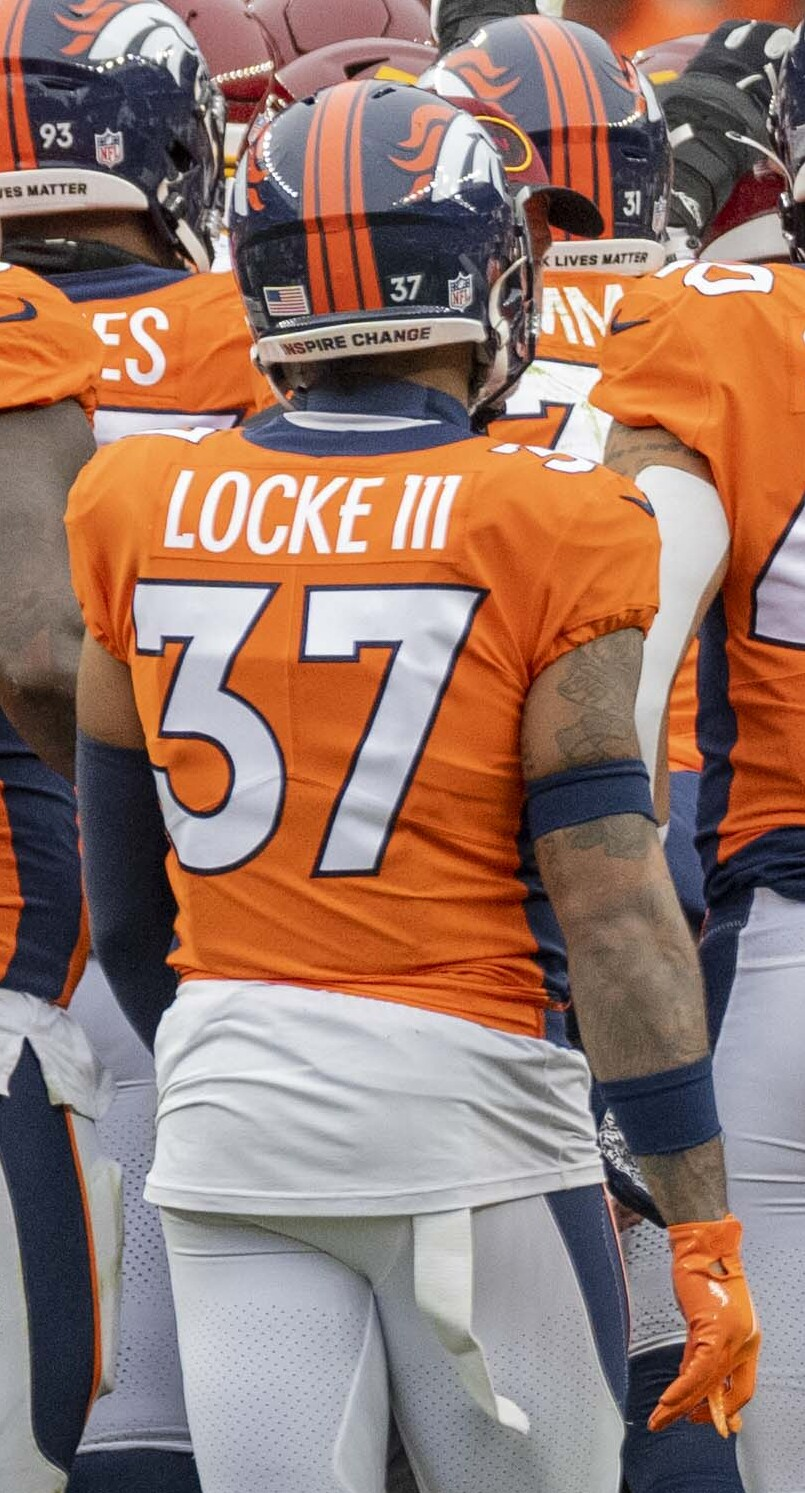
- Locke with the Denver Broncos in 2021

No. 1 – Dallas Cowboys
- Position: Safety
- Roster status: Active

Personal information
- Born: February 12, 1997 (age 29); Beaumont, Texas, U.S.
- Listed height: 5 ft 10 in (1.78 m)
- Listed weight: 205 lb (93 kg)

Career information
- High school: Central (Beaumont)
- College: Texas (2015–2018)
- NFL draft: 2019: undrafted

Career history
- Pittsburgh Steelers (2019)*; Denver Broncos (2019–2025); Dallas Cowboys (2026–present)
- * Offseason or practice squad member only

Career NFL statistics as of Week 2, 2026
- Total tackles: 177
- Sacks: 4.0
- Forced fumbles: 5
- Pass deflections: 11
- Interceptions: 1
- Stats at Pro Football Reference

James Abner "P. J." Locke III (born February 12, 1997) is an American professional football safety for the Dallas Cowboys of the National Football League (NFL). He played college football for the Texas Longhorns. Locke was signed by the Pittsburgh Steelers as an undrafted free agent following the 2019 NFL draft. After being cut by the Steelers, he would sign with the Denver Broncos, playing in six seasons for them.

== Early life ==
Locke attended Central High School in Beaumont, Texas. He was a three-star recruit coming out of high school. Locke originally committed to Oregon, but flipped his commitment to Texas after receiving an offer.

== Professional career ==
Pre-draft measurables
Height	Weight	Arm length	Hand span	Wingspan	40-yard dash	10-yard split	20-yard split	20-yard shuttle	Three-cone drill	Vertical jump	Broad jump	Bench press
5 ft 10 1/4 in (1.78 m)	202 lb (92 kg)	31 in (0.79 m)	9 3/8 in (0.24 m)	6 ft 1 7/8 in (1.88 m)	4.57 s	1.62 s	2.58 s	4.26 s	7.13 s	36.0 in (0.91 m)	10 ft 0 in (3.05 m)	22 reps
All values from Pro Day

=== Pittsburgh Steelers ===
Locke was signed by the Pittsburgh Steelers as an undrafted free agent following the 2019 NFL draft on April 29, 2019. Locke was waived on August 31 during final roster cuts.

=== Denver Broncos ===
Locke was signed to the Denver Broncos' practice squad on December 17, 2019. He was waived during final roster cuts on September 5, 2020, and signed to the practice squad the following day. Locke was elevated to the active roster on September 14 for the team's Week 1 game against the Tennessee Titans, making his NFL debut; he reverted to the practice squad the next day. The Broncos promoted Locke to their active roster on September 24.

After the 2020 season, Locke established himself as a core special teamer and led the Broncos in special teams snaps.

On March 16, 2023, Locke re-signed with Denver. He was placed on short-term injured reserve on August 31, and activated on October 7. On October 22, Locke made his first NFL career interception on a pass from quarterback Jordan Love to seal a Broncos win at home against the Green Bay Packers.

On March 11, 2024, Locke signed a two-year, $7 million contract extension with the Broncos. After injuring himself in a Wild Card playoff game against the Buffalo Bills, Locke successfully underwent a spinal fusion surgery that no NFL player had ever previously returned from.

=== Dallas Cowboys ===
On March 10, 2026, Locke signed a one-year, $5 million contract with the Dallas Cowboys. He suffered a torn plantar fascia in Week 2 and was placed on injured reserve on September 26. He was activated on October 31.

== Career statistics ==
Legend
**Bold**	Career high

=== NFL ===
==== Regular season ====
Year	Team	Games		Tackles					Interceptions				Fumbles			
Year	Team	GP	GS	Cmb	Solo	Ast	Sck	TFL	PD	Int	Yds	TD	FF	FR	Yds	TD
2020	DEN	15	0	3	2	1	0.0	0	0	0	0	0	0	0	0	0
2021	DEN	16	0	6	5	1	0.0	0	0	0	0	0	0	0	0	0
2022	DEN	16	0	22	11	11	0.0	1	1	0	0	0	**2**	0	0	0
2023	DEN	12	8	53	33	20	**3.0**	2	**5**	**1**	**14**	0	**2**	0	0	0
2024	DEN	15	15	**74**	**50**	**24**	1.0	**3**	2	0	0	0	1	0	0	0
2025	DEN	16	3	16	9	7	0.0	1	3	0	0	0	0	0	0	0
2026	DAL	2	1	3	2	1	0.0	0	0	0	0	0	0	0	0	0
Career		92	27	177	112	65	4.0	7	11	1	14	0	5	0	0	0

==== Postseason ====
Year	Team	Games		Tackles					Interceptions				Fumbles			
Year	Team	GP	GS	Cmb	Solo	Ast	Sck	TFL	PD	Int	Yds	TD	FF	FR	Yds	TD
2024	DEN	1	1	10	5	5	0.0	0	0	0	0	0	0	0	0	0
2025	DEN	2	2	**12**	**6**	**6**	0.0	0	**1**	**1**	**30**	0	**1**	0	0	0
Career		3	3	22	11	11	0.0	0	1	1	30	0	1	0	0	0

=== College ===
Year	Team	GP	Tackles					Interceptions					Fumbles			
Year	Team	GP	Solo	Ast	Cmb	TfL	Sck	Int	Yds	Avg	TD	PD	FR	Yds	TD	FF
2015	Texas	12	10	4	14	1.0	0.0	0	0	0.0	0	1	0	0	0	1
2016	Texas	12	25	8	33	2.0	0.0	**2**	2	1.0	0	**6**	**1**	0	0	0
2017	Texas	9	24	15	39	2.5	0.0	0	0	0.0	0	2	0	0	0	1
2018	Texas	14	**57**	**20**	**77**	**5.5**	**0.5**	1	**22**	**22.0**	0	3	0	0	0	**2**
Career		47	116	47	163	11.0	1.5	3	24	8.0	0	12	1	0	0	4
