= Dane Key =

American football player (born 2003)

No. 87 – Denver Broncos
- Position: Wide receiver
- Roster status: Practice squad

Personal information
- Born: July 1, 2003 (age 23); Lexington, Kentucky, U.S.
- Listed height: 6 ft 3 in (1.91 m)
- Listed weight: 210 lb (95 kg)

Career information
- High school: Frederick Douglass (Lexington, Kentucky)
- College: Kentucky (2022–2024); Nebraska (2025)
- NFL draft: 2026: undrafted

Career history
- Denver Broncos (2026–present)*
- * Offseason or practice squad member only
- Stats at Pro Football Reference

Dane Key (born July 1, 2003) is an American professional football wide receiver for the Denver Broncos of the National Football League (NFL). He played college football for the Kentucky Wildcats and Nebraska Cornhuskers. Key was signed by the Broncos as an undrafted free agent in 2026.

== Early life ==
Key grew up in Lexington, Kentucky and attended Frederick Douglass High School. As a senior, he caught 53 passes for 959 yards and nine touchdowns and won the Paul Hornung Award as the best high school football player in Kentucky. Key committed to play college football at Kentucky over offers from Michigan, Oregon, South Carolina, and Western Kentucky.

== College career ==
=== Kentucky ===
Key joined the Kentucky Wildcats as an early enrollee. He entered his freshman season as a starter at wide receiver. Key finished the season with 37 receptions for 519 yards and six touchdowns. In his sophomore season he was a dominant force outside finishing with 42 receptions for 636 yards and 6 touchdowns. The following year in 2023 Key ended the season with 47 receptions for 715 yards but just 2 touchdowns.

On December 4, 2024, Key announced that he would enter the transfer portal.

=== Nebraska ===
On December 24, 2024, Key announced that he would transfer to Nebraska. Key then finished the regular season with 35 receptions for 424 yards and 5 touchdowns.

== Professional career ==
Pre-draft measurables
Height	Weight	Arm length	Hand span	Wingspan	40-yard dash	10-yard split	20-yard split	20-yard shuttle	Three-cone drill	Vertical jump	Broad jump
6 ft 2 5/8 in (1.90 m)	203 lb (92 kg)	32 1/8 in (0.82 m)	9 5/8 in (0.24 m)	6 ft 7 in (2.01 m)	4.60 s	1.65 s	2.67 s	4.66 s	7.01 s	34.5 in (0.88 m)	10 ft 2 in (3.10 m)
All values from Pro Day

After going unselected in the 2026 NFL draft, Key signed with the Denver Broncos as an undrafted free agent, joining his brother Devon. On August 30, 2026, Key was waived by the Broncos as a part of final roster cuts. He was re-signed to the team's practice squad the next day.

== Personal life ==
Key's father, Donte Key, played linebacker at Kentucky. His older brother, Devon, played at Western Kentucky and is also a member of the Denver Broncos.
