= Mike Purcell =

American football player (born 1991)

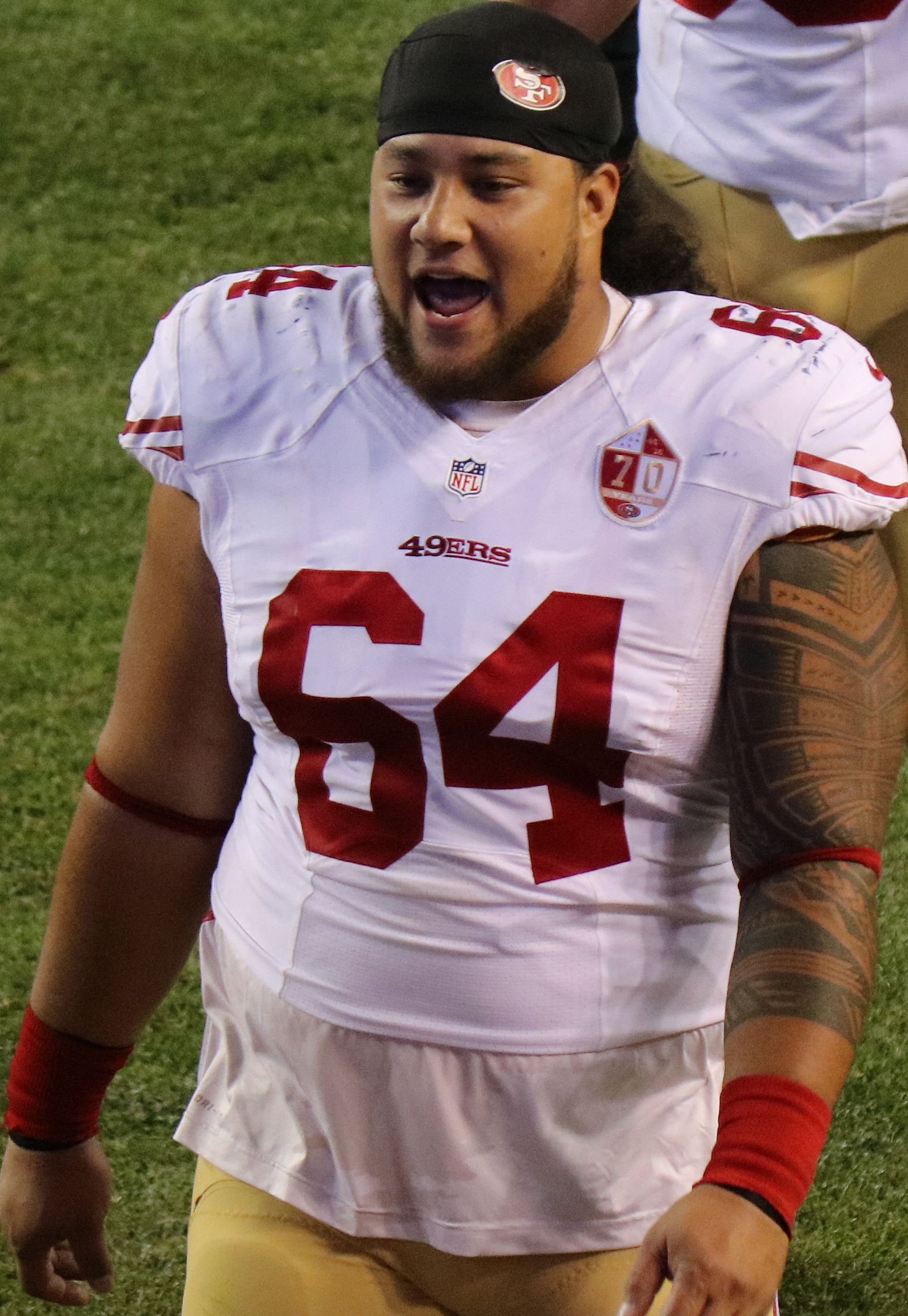
- Purcell with the San Francisco 49ers in 2016

No. 64, 98
- Position: Defensive tackle

Personal information
- Born: April 20, 1991 (age 35); Highlands Ranch, Colorado, U.S.
- Listed height: 6 ft 3 in (1.91 m)
- Listed weight: 328 lb (149 kg)

Career information
- High school: Highlands Ranch
- College: Wyoming (2009–2012)
- NFL draft: 2013: undrafted

Career history
- San Francisco 49ers (2013–2016); Los Angeles Rams (2017)*; Chicago Bears (2017)*; Carolina Panthers (2017)*; New England Patriots (2017)*; Kansas City Chiefs (2017–2018)*; Salt Lake Stallions (2019); Denver Broncos (2019–2023); New England Patriots (2024)*
- * Offseason or practice squad member only

Awards and highlights
- First-team All-Mountain West (2012)

Career NFL statistics
- Total tackles: 208
- Sacks: 3.5
- Forced fumbles: 1
- Fumble recoveries: 3
- Pass deflections: 4
- Stats at Pro Football Reference

Michael Purcell (born April 20, 1991) is an American former professional football player who was a defensive tackle in the National Football League (NFL). He played college football for the Wyoming Cowboys, and was signed by the San Francisco 49ers as an undrafted free agent in 2013.

== College career ==
Purcell was born in Highlands Ranch, Colorado to a Samoan father and Hawaiian mother. He played 42 games (36 starts) at the University of Wyoming and totaled 197 tackles, four sacks, three forced fumbles and two fumble recoveries in his four-year career. He earned first-team All-Mountain West Conference honors as a senior after recording 83 tackles, 1.5 sacks and two forced fumbles.

== Professional career ==
Pre-draft measurables
Height	Weight	Arm length	Hand span	40-yard dash	10-yard split	20-yard split	20-yard shuttle	Three-cone drill	Vertical jump	Broad jump	Bench press
6 ft 3 in (1.91 m)	305 lb (138 kg)	32 3/8 in (0.82 m)	9 7/8 in (0.25 m)	5.18 s	1.79 s	2.99 s	4.68 s	7.59 s	31.5 in (0.80 m)	9 ft 8 in (2.95 m)	26 reps
All values from Pro Day

=== San Francisco 49ers ===
Purcell was signed by the San Francisco 49ers as an undrafted free agent on May 7, 2013. He was signed to the team's practice squad on September 2. On January 22, 2014, Purcell signed a reserve/future contract with San Francisco, before being signed to the team's practice squad on August 31. On December 19, Purcell was promoted to the active roster after Ray McDonald's release on December 17.

In 2015, Purcell played in eight games (three starts) with and recorded 15 tackles (11 solo) and one sack. In 2016, he played in a 15 games (5 starts) with and totaled 26 tackles (17 solo) and one forced fumble.

On February 27, 2017, Purcell signed a one-year tender with the 49ers. On May 2, Purcell was released by the 49ers.

=== Los Angeles Rams ===
On May 3, 2017, Purcell was claimed off waivers by the Los Angeles Rams. He was released by Los Angeles on September 2.

=== Chicago Bears ===
On September 19, 2017, Purcell was signed to the Chicago Bears' practice squad. He was released by the Bears on October 6.

=== Carolina Panthers ===
On October 10, 2017, Purcell was signed to the Carolina Panthers' practice squad. He was released by the Panthers on October 16.

=== New England Patriots ===
On October 25, 2017, Purcell was signed to the New England Patriots' practice squad, but was released the next day. He was re-signed to the team's practice squad on November 7. Purcell was released by New England again on November 22.

=== Kansas City Chiefs ===
On November 28, 2017, Purcell was signed to the Kansas City Chiefs' practice squad. He signed a reserve/future contract with the Chiefs on January 10, 2018. Purcell was released by Kansas City on May 1. He was re-signed by the Chiefs on July 27. Purcell was released again on September 1.

=== Salt Lake Stallions ===
In 2019, Purcell joined the Salt Lake Stallions of the Alliance of American Football.

=== Denver Broncos ===
On April 22, 2019, Purcell signed with the Denver Broncos.

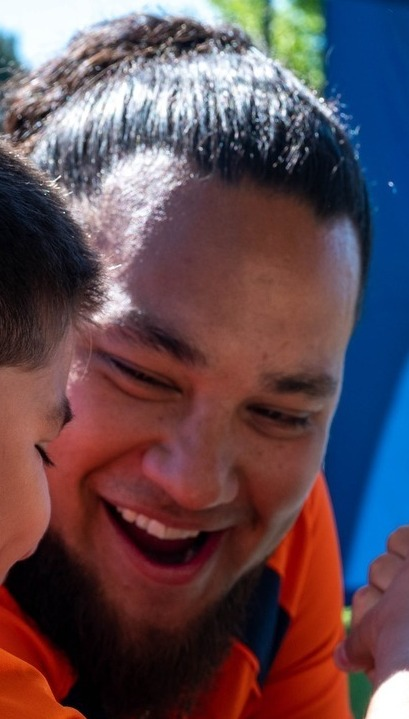
Purcell with the Denver Broncos in 2022

Purcell signed a one-year restricted free agent tender with the Broncos on April 18, 2020. In Week 2 of the 2020 season against the Pittsburgh Steelers, Purcell recorded his first sack in five years on Ben Roethlisberger during a 26–21 loss. On October 6, he signed a three-year, $14.8 million contract extension with the Broncos. Purcell was placed on injured reserve after suffering a season-ending foot injury in Week 7 on October 27.

Purcell was released by the Broncos during final roster cuts on August 30, 2022. On August 31, he re-signed with the Broncos.

=== New England Patriots (second stint) ===
On August 1, 2024, Purcell signed with the New England Patriots. He was released by the Patriots on August 21.

On January 28, 2025, Purcell's agent announced his retirement from the NFL.

== NFL career statistics ==
Legend
**Bold**	Career high

Year	Team	Games		Tackles					Interceptions					Fumbles			
Year	Team	GP	GS	Cmb	Solo	Ast	Sck	TFL	Int	Yds	TD	Lng	PD	FF	FR	Yds	TD
2014	SFO	2	0	1	1	0	0.0	0	0	0	0	0	0	0	0	0	0
2015	SFO	8	3	15	11	4	1.0	1	0	0	0	0	0	0	0	0	0
2016	SFO	15	5	26	17	9	0.0	1	0	0	0	0	0	**1**	0	0	0
2019	DEN	13	7	**48**	**28**	20	0.0	**8**	0	0	0	0	0	0	0	0	0
2020	DEN	6	6	15	10	5	1.0	2	0	0	0	0	0	0	0	0	0
2021	DEN	13	**10**	33	17	16	0.0	1	0	0	0	0	1	0	**1**	0	0
2022	DEN	**17**	4	45	21	**24**	**1.5**	1	0	0	0	0	0	0	**1**	0	0
2023	DEN	16	**10**	25	11	14	0.0	1	0	0	0	0	**3**	0	**1**	-1	0
Career		90	45	208	116	92	3.5	15	0	0	0	0	4	1	3	-1	0
