= Thomas Incoom =

American football linebacker (born 1999)

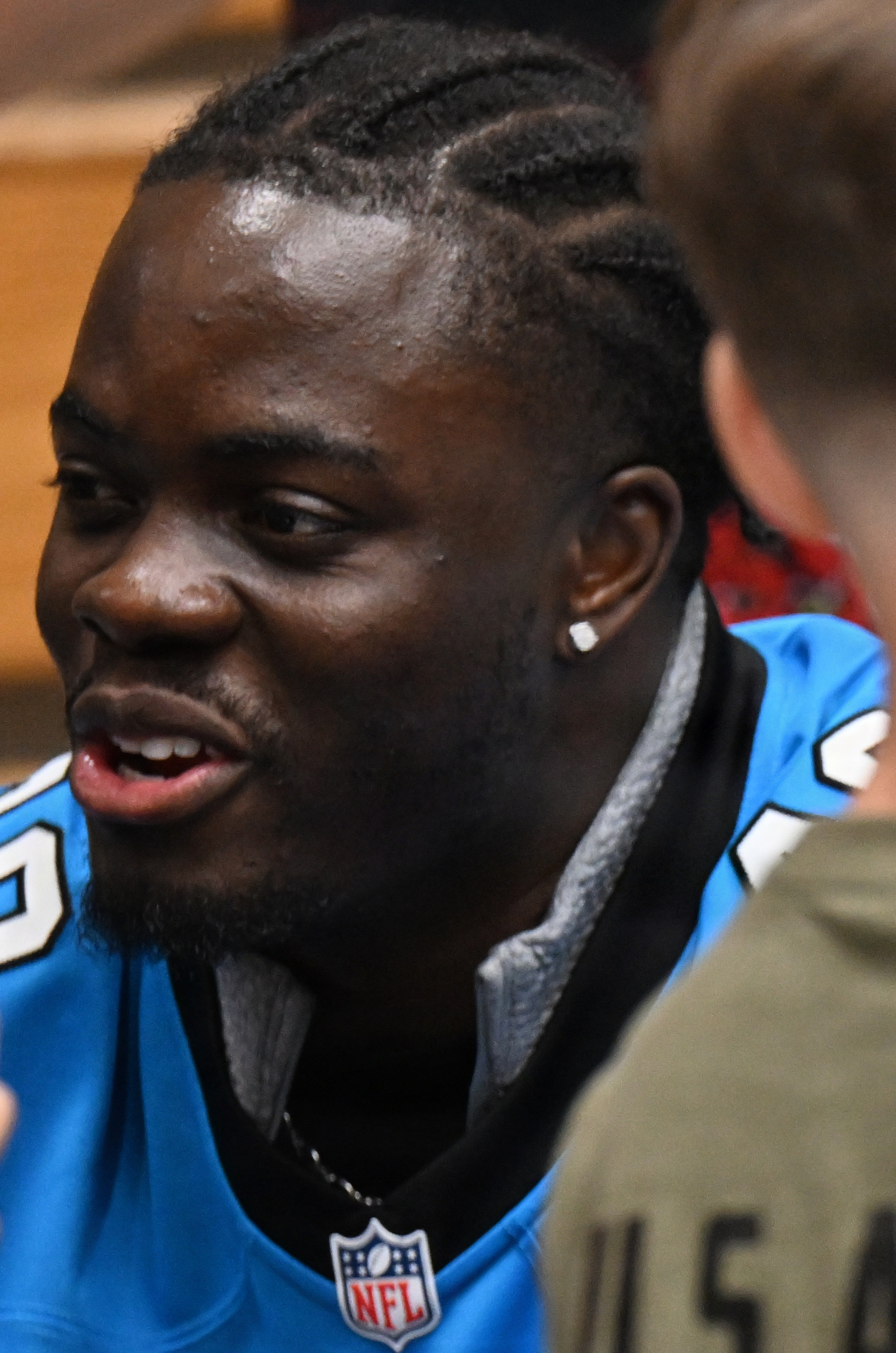
- Incoom in 2026

No. 48 – Carolina Panthers
- Position: Outside linebacker
- Roster status: Injured reserve

Personal information
- Born: February 19, 1999 (age 27); Ghana
- Listed height: 6 ft 2 in (1.88 m)
- Listed weight: 248 lb (112 kg)

Career information
- High school: Stone Mountain (Stone Mountain, Georgia, U.S.)
- College: Valdosta State (2017–2020); Central Michigan (2021–2022)
- NFL draft: 2023: undrafted

Career history
- Denver Broncos (2023); Carolina Panthers (2024–present)

Awards and highlights
- First-team All-MAC (2022); First-team All-GSC (2019)

Career NFL statistics as of 2025
- Total tackles: 27
- Stats at Pro Football Reference

Thomas Incoom (born February 19, 1999) is a Ghanaian professional American football outside linebacker for the Carolina Panthers of the National Football League (NFL). He played college football for the Valdosta State Blazers and Central Michigan Chippewas and was signed by the Denver Broncos as an undrafted free agent in 2023.

== Early life ==
Born in Ghana, Incoom moved to the United States at the age of 12. He grew up in Stone Mountain, Georgia and attended Stone Mountain High School. He committed to play football at Valdosta State.

== College career ==
In his collegiate career he totaled 146 tackles, 45 being for a loss, 28.5 sacks, 2 pass deflections, 3 forced fumbles one going for a touchdown, and 5 forced fumbles. In the 2019 season he was named first team all GSC. His best collegiate year occurred in 2022 where he posted 57 tackles, 19 going for a loss, 11.5 sacks, 2 fumble recovery one going all the way for a touchdown, and a forced fumble. His efforts in the 2022 season resulted in him being named first team all-MAC.

Incoom was projected to be a 6th to 7th round pick in the 2023 NFL draft.

== Professional career ==
Pre-draft measurables
| Height | Weight | Arm length | Hand span | Wingspan | 40-yard dash | 10-yard split | 20-yard split | 20-yard shuttle | Three-cone drill | Vertical jump | Broad jump | Bench press |
|---|---|---|---|---|---|---|---|---|---|---|---|---|
| 6 ft 2 in (1.88 m) | 262 lb (119 kg) | 33 1/4 in (0.84 m) | 8 3/4 in (0.22 m) | 6 ft 6 7/8 in (2.00 m) | 4.66 s | 1.65 s | 2.68 s | 4.33 s | 7.10 s | 30.5 in (0.77 m) | 9 ft 10 in (3.00 m) | 23 reps |
All values from NFL Combine/Pro Day

=== Denver Broncos ===
After going undrafted in the 2023 NFL draft, Incoom signed with the Denver Broncos as an undrafted free agent.

Incoom appeared in four games with the Broncos during the 2023 season, recording one tackle against Miami in a Denver loss and assisting on a tackle against Detroit, also a Denver loss.

On August 27, 2024, Incoom was waived by the Broncos.

=== Carolina Panthers ===
On August 28, 2024, Incoom was signed to the Carolina Panthers' practice squad. He was promoted to the active roster on October 8. Incoom was waived on November 30 and re-signed to the practice squad three days later. He signed a reserve/future contract with Carolina on January 6, 2025.

Incoom made the Panthers' roster in 2025, playing in all 17 games as a core special teamer. On March 10, 2026, Incoom re-signed with the Panthers.
