= Lou Ayeni =

American football coach

Denver Broncos
- Title: Running backs coach

Career information
- Position: Safety
- High school: Woodbury High School
- College: Northwestern
- NFL draft: 2004: undrafted

Career history

Playing
- Indianapolis Colts (2004)*; St. Louis Rams (2005)*
- * Offseason or practice squad member only

Coaching
- Northwestern (2008–2009) Graduate assistant; Toledo (2010–2013); Running backs coach (2010); Associate head coach / Run game coordinator / Running backs coach (2011–2013); Iowa State (2014–2017); Running backs coach (2014–2015); Associate head coach / Run game coordinator / Running backs coach (2016–2017); Northwestern (2018–2022) Running backs coach / Recruiting coordinator; Denver Broncos (2023–present) Running back coach

Lou Ayeni is an American professional football coach and former running back who is the running backs coach for the Denver Broncos of the National Football League (NFL).

== Playing career ==
Ayeni attended Woodbury High School, where he rushed for 3,504 yards and 47 touchdowns and led his school to its first state title in 1998. He played college football as a running back for the Northwestern Wildcats from 1999 to 2002 before switching to safety for his final season. After his time with the Wildcats, Ayeni went undrafted where he played briefly for the Indianapolis Colts and the St. Louis Rams.

== Coaching career ==
Ayeni got his first coaching job in 2008, where he was hired by his alma mater Northwestern as a graduate assistant. In 2010, he was hired by the Toledo Rockets as running backs coach, where he was eventually promoted to also serve as associate head coach and run game coordinator. Ahead of the 2014 season, Ayeni joined the Iowa State Cyclones as the team's running backs coach. During his time with Iowa State, he also added the roles of associate head coach and run game coordinator. In 2018, Ayeni returned to his alma mater Northwestern, this time as the Wildcats running backs coach and recruiting coordinator. Ahead of the 2023 season, he got his first NFL coaching job with the Denver Broncos as the teams running backs coach.
