= Lucas Krull =

American football player (born 1998)

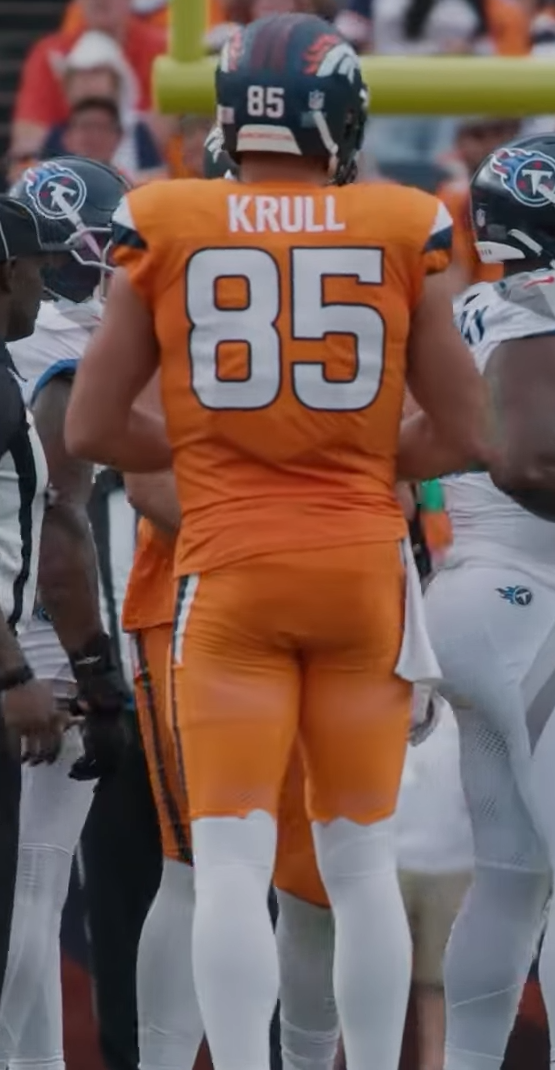
- Krull with the Denver Broncos in 2025

No. 85 – Denver Broncos
- Position: Tight end
- Roster status: Practice squad

Personal information
- Born: July 11, 1998 (age 28); Shawnee, Kansas, U.S.
- Listed height: 6 ft 6 in (1.98 m)
- Listed weight: 260 lb (118 kg)

Career information
- High school: Mill Valley (Shawnee)
- College: Jefferson (2017–2018); Florida (2018–2020); Pittsburgh (2020–2021)
- NFL draft: 2022: undrafted

Career history
- New Orleans Saints (2022); Denver Broncos (2023–present)

Awards and highlights
- Second-team All-ACC (2021)

Career NFL statistics as of 2025
- Receptions: 29
- Receiving yards: 262
- Receiving touchdowns: 1
- Stats at Pro Football Reference

Lucas Krull (born July 11, 1998) is an American professional football tight end for the Denver Broncos of the National Football League (NFL). He played college football for the Florida Gators before transferring to the Pittsburgh Panthers. Krull was signed by the New Orleans Saints as an undrafted free agent in 2022.

== Early life ==
Krull grew up in Shawnee, Kansas and played high school baseball and football at Mill Valley High School.

== College career ==
Krull initially committed to play baseball for Arkansas. Krull played junior college baseball for Jefferson College for one year before committing to Florida. While at Jefferson College, Krull had 27 strikeouts over 16 and 2/3 innings. As a left-handed pitcher, Krull was selected by the San Francisco Giants in the 34th round of the 2018 MLB draft from Jefferson College (Hillsboro, MO). Krull played football at Florida between 2018 and 2020 before transferring again to Pittsburgh. In 2020, Krull suffered a knee injury and missed most of the season. However, in 2021 Krull earned second-team All-ACC accolades starting 11 out of 14 games. Krull had 38 receptions for 451 yards (11.9 average), and six touchdowns.

== Professional career ==
Pre-draft measurables
Height	Weight	Arm length	Hand span	Wingspan	40-yard dash	10-yard split	20-yard split	20-yard shuttle	Three-cone drill	Vertical jump	Broad jump	Bench press
6 ft 6 1/8 in (1.98 m)	253 lb (115 kg)	33 5/8 in (0.85 m)	9 3/8 in (0.24 m)	6 ft 9 3/8 in (2.07 m)	4.64 s	1.62 s	2.66 s	4.38 s	7.15 s	35.0 in (0.89 m)	10 ft 0 in (3.05 m)	14 reps
All values from Pro Day

=== New Orleans Saints ===
After going unselected in the 2022 NFL draft, Krull was signed by the New Orleans Saints as an undrafted free agent. The Saints had been impressed with Krull from his pro day where he showcased his athleticism, ball skills, and speed by running a 4.54 second 40-yard dash. He was released during the final roster cuts, but afterwards was brought back as a member of the practice squad. Krull was elevated to the active roster on December 5, for the Saints' game with the Tampa Bay Buccaneers, and made his NFL debut in the game, appearing on 11 snaps. He signed a reserve/future contract on January 9, 2023.

On August 29, 2023, Krull was waived by the Saints.

=== Denver Broncos ===
On August 31, 2023, Krull was signed to the Denver Broncos' practice squad. He was signed to the active roster on December 15. He caught his first career touchdown in Week 16 against the New England Patriots. In total, Krull played in seven games in 2023.

In 2024, Krull saw an increased role in the Broncos offense, playing in 13 games and recording 19 receptions for 152 yards.

On March 4, 2025, the Broncos assigned his exclusive-rights free agent tender, keeping him under contract through the 2025 season. After playing in the Broncos first three games of the season, Krull was inactive against the Cincinnati Bengals in Week 4. He suffered a broken bone in his foot during practice on October 3, and was placed on short-term injured reserve the next day. On October 27, Krull was ruled out for eight weeks after undergoing surgery to repair the fifth metatarsal bone in his left foot.

On March 12, 2026, Krull re-signed with the Broncos on a one-year contract. On August 30, he was released by the Broncos as a part of final roster cuts. Krull was re–signed to Denver's practice squad the following day.
