= Demontrey Jacobs =

American football player (born 1998)

No. 67 – Arizona Cardinals
- Position: Offensive tackle
- Roster status: Practice squad

Personal information
- Born: November 22, 1998 (age 27); Gonzales, Louisiana, U.S.
- Listed height: 6 ft 6 in (1.98 m)
- Listed weight: 325 lb (147 kg)

Career information
- High school: East Ascension (Gonzales)
- College: Grambling State (2017–2019); South Florida (2020–2022)
- NFL draft: 2023: undrafted

Career history
- Denver Broncos (2023)*; New England Patriots (2024); Arizona Cardinals (2025–present)
- * Offseason or practice squad member only

Career NFL statistics as of 2025
- Games played: 20
- Games started: 13
- Stats at Pro Football Reference

Demontrey Jacobs (born November 22, 1998) is an American professional football offensive tackle for the Arizona Cardinals of the National Football League (NFL). He played college football at Grambling State and South Florida and was signed by the Denver Broncos as an undrafted free agent in 2023. He has also played for the New England Patriots.

== Early life ==
Jacobs was born on November 22, 1998, in Gonzales, Louisiana to Chad and Venessa Jacobs. He attended East Ascension High School.

== College career ==
Jacobs began playing college football at Grambling State in 2017 as a defensive lineman, but did not appear in any games his first season. Prior to the 2019 season, Jacobs made the switch to offensive tackle. He subsequently became a key contributor on the offensive line. In 2020, he transferred to South Florida, playing in seven games and starting one. In 2021, he started all 12 games of the season.

== Professional career ==
Pre-draft measurables
Height	Weight	Arm length	Hand span	Wingspan	40-yard dash	10-yard split	20-yard split	20-yard shuttle	Three-cone drill	Vertical jump	Broad jump	Bench press
6 ft 6 5/8 in (2.00 m)	312 lb (142 kg)	36 in (0.91 m)	11 1/4 in (0.29 m)	7 ft 3 3/8 in (2.22 m)	5.17 s	1.80 s	2.96 s	4.73 s	7.52 s	26.0 in (0.66 m)	9 ft 4 in (2.84 m)	22 reps
All values from Pro Day

=== Denver Broncos ===
After going unselected in the 2023 NFL draft, Jacobs was signed by the Denver Broncos as an undrafted free agent. He was waived by the Broncos on August 29, 2023 as part of final roster cuts, but was signed to the practice squad the next day.

On August 27, 2024, Jacobs was waived by the Broncos.

=== New England Patriots ===
On August 28, 2024, Jacobs was claimed off waivers by the New England Patriots. In Week 4 against the San Francisco 49ers, Jacobs made his first NFL career start at left tackle.

On August 26, 2025, Jacobs was waived by the Patriots as part of final roster cuts.

=== Arizona Cardinals ===
On August 28, 2025, Jacobs was signed to the Arizona Cardinals' practice squad. He was signed to the active roster on September 23.

On August 30, 2026, Jacobs was waived by the Cardinals as a part of final roster cuts; he was re-signed to the team's practice squad the following day.

== Personal life ==
In college, he majored in business management with aspirations to open his own barbershop.
