= 2022 Denver Broncos season =

American football team season

- Owner: Rob Walton (Note: Other members of the ownership group include Carrie Walton Penner, Greg Penner, Mellody Hobson, Condoleezza Rice, and Lewis Hamilton)
- General manager: George Paton
- Head coach: Nathaniel Hackett (fired on December 26, 4–11 record); Jerry Rosburg (interim; 1–1 record)
- Home stadium: Empower Field at Mile High

Results
- Record: 5–12
- Division place: 4th AFC West
- Playoffs: Did not qualify
- All-Pros: S Justin Simmons (2nd team); CB Patrick Surtain II (1st team)
- Pro Bowlers: CB Patrick Surtain II

Uniform
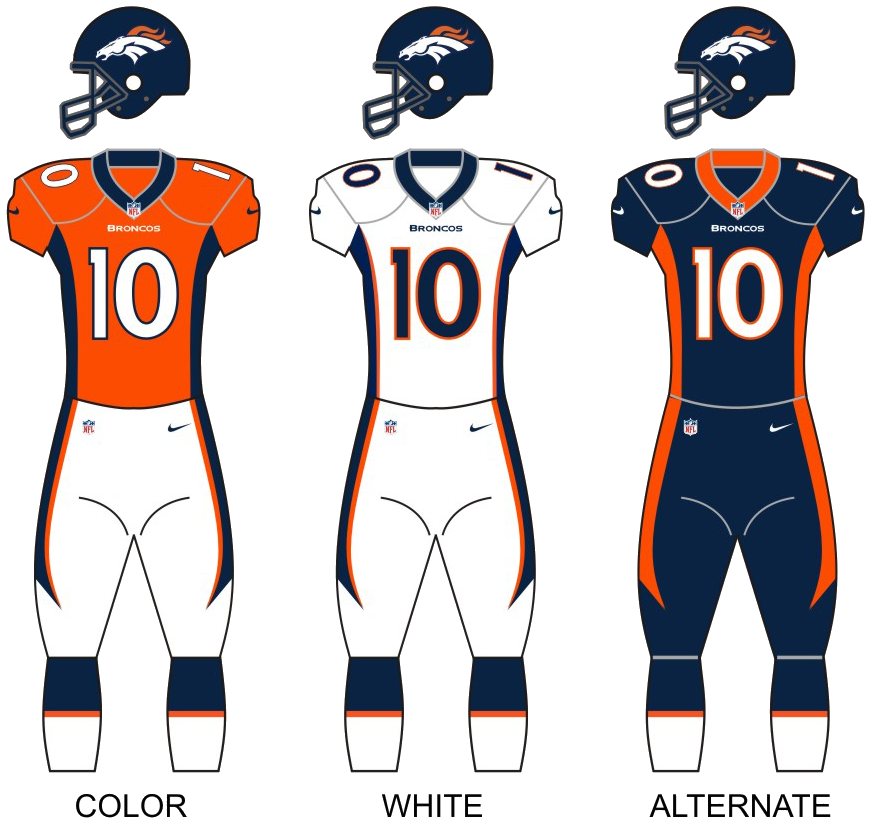

The 2022 season was the Denver Broncos' 53rd in the National Football League (NFL), their 63rd overall, their second under the leadership of general manager George Paton, and their first and only season under head coach Nathaniel Hackett. This was also their first season under the ownership of the Walton-Penner Family Group, replacing the Pat Bowlen Trust that had existed following the death of longtime owner Pat Bowlen in 2019. The group was headed by former Walmart chairman S. Robson Walton and his son-in-law, current Walmart chairman Greg Penner, with Penner becoming CEO and operating head of the franchise.

Despite a 2–1 start, the Broncos failed to improve on their 7–10 record from 2021 or make the playoffs for the first time since 2015, as they made a blockbuster trade to land former Seattle Seahawks quarterback Russell Wilson. The team's defense ranked near the top in several categories; however, injuries, poor offensive performances and numerous penalties plagued the team, ranking at or near the bottom of the league in several offensive categories, including last in scoring. The Broncos did not score 30 or more points until their final game of the season. The Broncos suffered their sixth consecutive losing season and missed the playoffs for the seventh straight season. Following a 51–14 loss at the Los Angeles Rams on Christmas Day, Hackett was fired on December 26, two weeks before the end of the season, after a 4–11 start. This was the second time the Broncos fired a head coach in the calendar year of 2022.

The Broncos finished their disastrous season with a 5–12 record, tying a franchise record for losses in a season, with a 4–12 record that was previously set in 2010. The Broncos also finished the season with 22 players on injured reserve, the second most in the league. Several analysts and observers argued that Hackett's coaching was a major reason for Wilson's decline and Denver's woeful underachieving in 2022.

== Coaching changes ==
=== Off-season ===
On January 9, one day after the Broncos' 2021 regular season finale, head coach Vic Fangio was fired after compiling a 19–30 (.388) record in three seasons and two consecutive last-place finishes. On January 27, the Broncos finalized a deal for Nathaniel Hackett to become the 18th head coach in the franchise's history, replacing Fangio. This was Hackett's first head coaching job, after previously serving as the Buffalo Bills' offensive coordinator from 2013 to 2014, the Jacksonville Jaguars' quarterbacks coach/offensive coordinator from 2015 to 2018 and the Green Bay Packers' offensive coordinator from 2019 to 2021. Hackett became the Broncos' sixth different head coach since 2008.

In the month after Hackett's hiring, the Broncos underwent the following coaching changes:

2022 Denver Broncos coaching staff changes
Position	Previous coach	2022 replacement	Source
Offensive coordinator	Pat Shurmur, 2020–2021	Justin Outten	
Offensive line coach	Mike Munchak, 2019–2021	Butch Barry	
Passing game coordinator/quarterbacks coach	Mike Shula, 2019–2021	Klint Kubiak	
Assistant offensive line coach	Chris Kuper, 2019–2021	Ben Steele	
Assistant special teams coach	Chris Gould, 2017–2021	Mike Mallory	
Linebackers coach	Reggie Herring, 2015–2021	Peter Hansen	
Outside linebackers coach	John Pagano, 2020–2021	Bert Watts	
Offensive quality control coach	Chris Cook, 2021; Justin Rascati, 2019–2021	Ramon Chinyoung	
Senior defensive assistant	None	Dom Capers	
Tight ends coach	Wade Harman, 2019–2021	Jake Moreland	
Assistant defensive backs coach	None	Ola Adams	
Running backs coach	Curtis Modkins, 2018–2021	Tyrone Wheatley	
Defensive coordinator	Ed Donatell, 2019–2021	Ejiro Evero	
Defensive line coach	Bill Kollar, 2015–2021	Marcus Dixon	
Special teams coach	Tom McMahon, 2018–2021	Dwayne Stukes	
Defensive quality control coach	Nathaniel Willingham, 2019–2021	Andrew Carter	

Note: Bill Kollar remained on the Broncos' coaching staff as a defensive consultant.

=== In-season ===
On December 26, one day after an embarrassing 51–14 loss to the Los Angeles Rams, and as a result of the team's offensive struggles, head coach Nathaniel Hackett was fired after a 4–11 start. Jerry Rosburg, who was hired in Week 3 to assist Hackett following a series of game management errors in the team's first two games, was named the team's interim coach for the last two games of the season. Rosburg served as the Baltimore Ravens' special teams coach from 2008–2018. Hackett became the fifth head coach in NFL history to not last a full season, and his tenure was the shortest for a non-interim coach in franchise history. That same day, offensive line coach Butch Barry and special teams coach Dwayne Stukes, both in their first season with the Broncos, were also fired.

== Front office changes ==
On February 3, Darren Mougey, who served as the Broncos' Director of Player Personnel in 2021, was promoted to assistant general manager. Mougey previously served as a Broncos' scouting assistant from 2012 to 2020.

== Roster changes ==
=== Future contracts ===
All players listed below were signed to reserve/future contracts from January 10–12, unless noted otherwise. Each player was officially added to the active roster on March 16—the first day of the 2022 league year.

Position	Player	Notes
TE	Shaun Beyer	waived May 13
RB	Damarea Crockett	placed on injured reserve August 2
WR	Travis Fulgham	waived August 16
OT	Drew Himmelman	waived May 13
G	Zack Johnson	waived May 13, re-signed May 16, waived August 30
DE	Jonathan Kongbo	waived August 30, assigned to the practice squad on August 31, promoted to the active roster on October 6, waived October 11, promoted to the active roster on December 31
DE	Marquiss Spencer	designated as waived/injured on August 22
OT	Casey Tucker	signed January 20, designated as waived/injured on August 23
LB	Barrington Wade	designated as waived/injured on August 25

=== Free agents ===
==== Unrestricted ====
Position	Player	2022 team	Notes
QB	Teddy Bridgewater	Miami Dolphins	signed with the Dolphins on March 14
CB	Bryce Callahan	Los Angeles Chargers	signed with the Chargers on May 4
OT	Cameron Fleming	Denver Broncos	signed July 27
CB	Mike Ford	Atlanta Falcons	signed with the Falcons on April 8
CB	Kyle Fuller	Baltimore Ravens	signed with the Ravens on May 24
RB	Melvin Gordon	Denver Broncos	re-signed April 27, waived November 21
CB	Nate Hairston	Minnesota Vikings	signed with the Vikings on March 28
NT	Justin Hamilton	Washington Commanders	originally an RFA, signed with the Commanders on June 14
S	Kareem Jackson	Denver Broncos	re-signed April 11
LB	Josey Jewell	Denver Broncos	re-signed March 15
LB	A. J. Johnson	None	
C	Brett Jones	None	
LB	Micah Kiser	Las Vegas Raiders	signed with the Raiders on March 21
OT	Bobby Massie	None	
LB	Natrez Patrick	Detroit Lions	originally an RFA, signed with the Lions on May 16
TE	Eric Saubert	Denver Broncos	re-signed May 4
G	Austin Schlottmann	Minnesota Vikings	originally an RFA, signed with the Vikings on March 16
WR	Diontae Spencer	None	originally an RFA
DE	Shamar Stephen	None	
LB	Stephen Weatherly	Cleveland Browns	signed with the Browns on April 18
NT	DeShawn Williams	Denver Broncos	originally an RFA, re-signed March 18
LB	Kenny Young	Las Vegas Raiders	signed with the Raiders on May 9

Note: Unrestricted free agents who were originally Restricted free agents (RFA) had three accrued seasons whose contracts expired at the end of the previous season, and did not receive a qualifying offer before the start of the 2022 league year on March 16.

==== Restricted and exclusive-rights ====
Position	Player	Tag	2022 team	Notes
OT	Calvin Anderson	RFA	Denver Broncos	re-signed March 13
TE	Andrew Beck	RFA	Denver Broncos	re-signed March 13
LB	Jonas Griffith	ERFA	Denver Broncos	assigned tender on March 13, placed on injured reserve November 18
RB	Adrian Killins	ERFA	None	
S	P. J. Locke	ERFA	Denver Broncos	assigned tender on March 13, re-signed April 11
LB	Malik Reed	RFA	Pittsburgh Steelers	assigned tender on March 17, re-signed April 11, traded to the Steelers on August 30
QB	Brett Rypien	ERFA	Denver Broncos	assigned tender on March 13, re-signed April 11
Restricted Free Agent (RFA): Players with three accrued seasons whose contracts expired at the end of the previous season Exclusive-Rights Free Agent (ERFA): Players with two or fewer accrued seasons whose contracts expired at the end of the previous season

=== Signings ===
Position	Player	2021 team(s)	Notes
LB	Dakota Allen	Jacksonville Jaguars	signed November 22, placed on injured reserve December 19
CB	Blessuan Austin	Denver Broncos; Seattle Seahawks	signed April 27, waived August 29
RB	Tyler Badie	None	signed off the Baltimore Ravens' practice squad on December 29
CB	Essang Bassey	Denver Broncos; Los Angeles Chargers	claimed off waivers from the Chargers on February 14, waived September 1, promoted to the active roster on September 14
G	Ben Braden	Green Bay Packers	signed March 14, released August 15
OT	Tom Compton	San Francisco 49ers	signed March 17, placed on the physically unable to perform list August 23, activated from the physically unable to perform list November 15, placed on injured reserve December 22
LS	Mitchell Fraboni	None	signed October 24, placed on injured reserve November 17
DE	Elijah Garcia	None	signed off the Los Angeles Rams' practice squad on December 7
DE	Randy Gregory	Dallas Cowboys	signed March 18, placed on injured reserve October 4, activated from injured reserve on December 17, placed on season-ending injured reserve December 31
T	Christian DiLauro	None	promoted from the practice squad on December 19
RB	JaQuan Hardy	Dallas Cowboys	signed August 10, waived August 29
S	Anthony Harris	Philadelphia Eagles	promoted from the practice squad on November 8, waived December 6
DE	Jonathan Harris	Denver Broncos	promoted to the active roster on November 15
CB	Lamar Jackson	None	promoted from the practice squad on December 31
QB	Josh Johnson	New York Jets; Baltimore Ravens	signed March 18, released August 30, assigned to the practice squad on August 31
DT	D. J. Jones	San Francisco 49ers	signed March 14
CB	Donnie Lewis	None	signed April 27, designated as waived/injured on August 29
RB	Marlon Mack	Indianapolis Colts	signed October 24, placed on injured reserve January 3
CB	Ja'Quan McMillian	None	promoted from the practice squad on January 3
RB	Latavius Murray	Baltimore Ravens	signed October 4
RB	Devine Ozigbo	None	claimed off waivers from the New Orleans Saints on August 22, waived August 30, assigned to the practice squad on August 31
CB	Darius Phillips	Cincinnati Bengals	signed September 1
WR	Trey Quinn	None	signed April 27, waived August 23
S	J. R. Reed	Los Angeles Rams; New York Giants	signed March 21, waived August 30
LB	Joe Schobert	Pittsburgh Steelers	signed August 15, released August 23
RB	Stevie Scott III	None	signed August 10, waived August 23
WR	Darrius Shepherd	None	signed August 4, waived August 30, assigned to the practice squad on August 31, released from the practice squad on October 11
T	Will Sherman	None	promoted from the practice squad on January 3
LB	Alex Singleton	Philadelphia Eagles	signed March 18
WR	Freddie Swain	Seattle Seahawks	signed December 14
TE	Eric Tomlinson	Baltimore Ravens	signed March 15, released August 30, re-signed August 31
OT	Billy Turner	Green Bay Packers	signed March 24, placed on injured reserve November 15
CB	K'Waun Williams	San Francisco 49ers	signed March 23

=== Departures ===
Position	Player	Notes
WR	Tyrie Cleveland	waived November 15
RB	Melvin Gordon	waived November 21
WR	Kendall Hinton	released August 30, assigned to the practice squad on August 31, promoted to the active roster on October 10
S	Jamar Johnson	waived August 16
P	Sam Martin	released August 29
LB	Andre Mintze	waived May 16
G	Netane Muti	waived August 30, assigned to the practice squad on August 31
CB	Michael Ojemudia	waived December 27
NT	Mike Purcell	released August 30, re-signed August 31
WR	Seth Williams	waived August 30

=== Draft ===
2022 Denver Broncos Draft
Round	Selection	Player	Position	College	Notes
1	9	Traded to Seattle (Note: The Broncos traded QB Drew Lock, DE Shelby Harris, TE Noah Fant, first-, second- and fifth-round selections (9th, 40th and 145th overall), and 2023 first- and second-round selections to the Seattle Seahawks in exchange for QB Russell Wilson and a fourth-round selection (116th overall).)			
2	40	Traded to Seattle			
2	64	Nik Bonitto	LB	Oklahoma	from LA Rams (Note: The Broncos traded LB Von Miller to the Los Angeles Rams in exchange for second- and third-round selections (64th and 96th overall).)
3	75	Traded to Houston (Note: The Broncos traded a third-round selection (75th overall) to the Houston Texans in exchange for third- and fifth-round selections (80th and 162nd overall).)			
3	80	Greg Dulcich	TE	UCLA	from New Orleans via Houston
3	96	Traded to Indianapolis (Note: The Broncos traded a third-round selection (96th overall) to the Indianapolis Colts in exchange for a fifth-round selection (179th overall) and a 2023 third-round selection.)			from LA Rams
4	115	Damarri Mathis	CB	Pittsburgh	
4	116	Eyioma Uwazurike	DE	Iowa State	from Seattle
5	145	Traded to Seattle			from Detroit (Note: The Broncos traded WR Trinity Benson and a 2023 sixth-round pick to the Detroit Lions in exchange for fifth- and seventh-round selections (145th and 234th overall).)
5	152	Delarrin Turner-Yell	S	Oklahoma	
5	162	Montrell Washington	WR	Samford	from Philadelphia via Houston
5	171	Luke Wattenberg	C	Washington	from Green Bay (Note: The Broncos traded fifth- and seventh-round selections (179th and 234th overall) to the Green Bay Packers in exchange for a fifth-round selection (171st overall).)
5	179	Traded to Green Bay			from Indianapolis
6	187	Traded to San Francisco (Note: The Broncos traded a sixth-round selection (187th overall) and a 2023 seventh-round selection to the San Francisco 49ers in exchange for LB Jonas Griffith and a seventh-round selection (250th overall).)			
6	206	Matt Henningsen	DE	Wisconsin	from Tampa Bay via Jets and Eagles (Note: The Broncos traded CB Kary Vincent Jr. to the Philadelphia Eagles in exchange for a sixth-round selection (206th overall).)
7	232	Faion Hicks	CB	Wisconsin	
7	234	Traded to Green Bay			from Cleveland via Detroit
7	250	Traded to Minnesota (Note: The Broncos traded a seventh-round selection (250th overall) to Minnesota Vikings in exchange for DE Stephen Weatherly and a 2023 seventh-round selection.)			from San Francisco

Draft trades

=== Post-draft trades ===
- August 30: The Broncos traded linebacker Malik Reed and a 2023 seventh-round selection to the Pittsburgh Steelers in exchange for a 2023 sixth-round selection.
- November 1: The Broncos made two separate trades prior to the trade deadline: First, linebacker Bradley Chubb was traded to the Miami Dolphins, along with a 2025 fifth-round selection, in exchange for running back Chase Edmonds, a 2023 first-round selection and a 2024 fourth-round selection. Then, the Broncos acquired linebacker Jacob Martin and a 2024 fifth-round selection in a trade that sent their 2024 fourth-round selection to the New York Jets. Edmonds was later placed on injured reserve on November 21, and activated on December 24.

=== Undrafted free agents ===
All undrafted free agents were signed at the conclusion of the 2022 NFL draft on April 30, unless noted otherwise.

2022 Denver Broncos undrafted free agents
Player	Position	College	Notes
Christopher Allen	LB	Alabama	placed on injured reserve August 10
Max Borghi	RB	Washington State	originally signed and waived by the Indianapolis Colts, signed by the Broncos on August 3, waived August 16
Cortez Davis	CB	Hawaii	waived May 16
Kaden Davis	WR	Northwest Missouri State	waived August 16
Jeremiah Gemmel	LB	North Carolina	signed August 25, waived August 29
Sebastian Gutierrez	OT	Minot State	waived August 29
Brandon Johnson	WR	UCF	placed on injured reserve August 30, promoted to the active roster on December 3
Tyreik McAllister	RB	Charleston	designated as waived/injured on August 10
Ja'Quan McMillian	CB	East Carolina	waived August 30, assigned to the practice squad on August 31
Kana'i Mauga	LB	USC	waived August 30, assigned to the practice squad on August 31
Michael Niese	OT	Temple	waived August 30
Dylan Parham	TE	NC State	waived August 30, assigned to the practice squad on August 31
Jalen Virgil	WR, RS	Appalachian State	the only undrafted rookie to make the Week 1 roster
Rodney Williams	TE	UT Martin	waived August 16
Kadofi Wright	LB	Buffalo	waived July 27

=== Trade for Russell Wilson ===
On March 16, the Broncos acquired quarterback Russell Wilson and a 2022 fourth-round selection (No. 116 overall) from the Seattle Seahawks, in one of the largest trades in NFL history. The Broncos sent quarterback Drew Lock, tight end Noah Fant, defensive end Shelby Harris, their 2022 first-, second- and fifth-round selections (Nos. 9, 40 and 145 overall) and their 2023 first- and second-round selections to the Seahawks in exchange. In his ten seasons in Seattle (2012–2021), Wilson reached nine Pro Bowls, led the Seahawks to eight playoff appearances and two Super Bowl berths, including a 43–8 victory over the Broncos in Super Bowl XLVIII. Wilson became the Broncos' 12th different starting quarterback since Peyton Manning's retirement after their 2015 Super Bowl-winning season—tied with the Washington Commanders for the most in the NFL during that span. Wilson was released after the 2023 season.

=== Injuries ===
Position	Player	Time & type of injury	Games missed	Source(s)
LS	Jacob Bobenmoyer	hand/wrist, Week 5	injured reserve, Weeks 6–10	
OT	Garett Bolles	leg fracture, Week 5	season-ending injured reserve, starting with Week 6	
RB	Mike Boone	ankle, Week 7	injured reserve, Weeks 8–12	
RB	Mike Boone	ankle, Week 14	season-ending injured reserve, starting with Week 15	
LB	Baron Browning	strained hip flexor, Week 7	Week 8	
T	Tom Compton	back, Week 15	season-ending injured reserve, beginning with Week 16	
RB	Damarea Crockett	torn ACL, preseason workouts	injured reserve, missed the entire 2022 season	
C	Lloyd Cushenberry	groin, Week 8	season-ending injured reserve, starting with Week 10	
CB	Ronald Darby	torn ACL, Week 5	season-ending injured reserve, starting with Week 6	
TE	Greg Dulcich	hamstring, training camp	injured reserve, Weeks 1–5	
TE	Greg Dulcich	hamstring, Week 16	season-ending injured reserve, starting with Week 17	
RB	Chase Edmonds	high ankle sprain, Week 11	injured reserve, Weeks 12–15	
LS	Mitchell Fraboni	fractured finger, Week 10	season-ending injured reserve, starting with Week 11	
LB	Randy Gregory	knee, Week 4	injured reserve, Weeks 4–14	
LB	Randy Gregory	knee, Week 16	season-ending injured reserve, starting with Week 17	
LB	Jonas Griffith	foot, Week 10	season-ending injured reserve, starting with Week 11	
WR	K. J. Hamler	hamstring, November 9 practice	Weeks 10–12; season-ending injured reserve, starting with Week 13	
RB	Marlon Mack	hamstring, Week 17	injured reserve, Week 18	
WR	Jerry Jeudy	ankle, Week 10	Weeks 11–12	
DE	Dre'Mont Jones	hip, Week 14	season-ending injured reserve, starting with Week 15	
CB	Michael Ojemudia	elbow, preseason	injured reserve, Weeks 1–5	
WR	Tim Patrick	torn ACL, preseason workouts	injured reserve, missed the entire 2022 season	
G	Dalton Risner	elbow, Week 17	injured reserve, Week 18	
S	Justin Simmons	quad, Week 1	injured reserve, Weeks 2–5	
OT	Billy Turner	knee, Week 10	injured reserve, Weeks 11–14	
RB	Javonte Williams	torn ACL, Week 4	season-ending injured reserve, starting with Week 5	
CB	K'Waun Williams	knee, Week 10	season-ending injured reserve, starting with Week 11	
QB	Russell Wilson	hamstring, Week 6	Week 7	
QB	Russell Wilson	concussion, Week 14	Week 15	

=== Practice squad elevations ===
Each NFL team is permitted to elevate up to two players from the practice squad to the active game day roster per week, with those designated players being allowed to return to the practice squad after each game without being exposed to waivers. Each player can be elevated a maximum of three times.

Week	Player(s) promoted	Source
2	WR Kendall Hinton, G Netane Muti	
3	DE Jonathan Harris, WR Kendall Hinton	
4	WR Kendall Hinton, G Netane Muti	
5	S Anthony Harris, RB Devine Ozigbo	
6	LS Mitchell Fraboni, S Anthony Harris	
7	LS Mitchell Fraboni, QB Josh Johnson	
10	T Quinn Bailey, DE Jonathan Harris	
11	WR Brandon Johnson, LB Harvey Langi	
12	CB Faion Hicks, WR Brandon Johnson	
13	CB Faion Hicks, LB Harvey Langi	
14	G Netane Muti, LB Harvey Langi	
15	QB Jarrett Guarantano, RB Devine Ozigbo	
16	CB Lamar Jackson, LB Wyatt Ray	
17	LB Wyatt Ray, LB Ray Wilborn	
18	LB Wyatt Ray, LB Ray Wilborn	

== Personnel ==
=== Staff / Coaches ===
2022 Denver Broncos staff
Front office: Owners – Walton-Penner Family Ownership Group; CEO – Greg Penner; President – Damani Leech; General manager – George Paton; Assistant general manager – Darren Mougey; Director of player personnel – Reed Burckhardt; Director of pro personnel – A. J. Durso; Executive director of football operations – Kelly Kleine; Vice president of football administration – Rich Hurtado; Vice president of football operation and compliance – Mark Thewes; Vice president of player development – Ray Jackson; Director of college scouting – Brian Stark; Senior personnel executive – Roman Phifer; Assistant director of college scouting – Nick Schiralli; Head coaches: Interim Head coach – Jerry Rosburg; Offensive coaches: Offensive coordinator – Justin Outten; Passing game coordinator/quarterbacks – Klint Kubiak; Running backs – Tyrone Wheatley; Wide receivers – Zach Azzanni; Tight ends – Jake Moreland; Interim Offensive line – Ben Steele; Offensive quality control – Ramon Chinyoung; Offensive quality control – Zach Grossi; Marlin Briscoe coaching fellowship – Mateo Kambui	Defensive coaches: Defensive coordinator – Ejiro Evero; Defensive line – Marcus Dixon; Linebackers – Peter Hansen; Outside linebackers – Bert Watts; Defensive backs – Christian Parker; Assistant defensive backs – Ola Adams; Senior defensive assistant – Dom Capers; Defensive quality control – Andrew Carter; Defense - special projects – Mayur Chaudhari; Defensive/special projects – Bill Kollar; Billy Thompson coaching fellowship – DeAndre Thompson; Special teams coaches: Interim Special teams coordinator – Mike Mallory; Strength and conditioning: Head strength and conditioning – Loren Landow; Assistant strength and conditioning – Richard Guarascio; Assistant strength and conditioning – Korey Jones; Assistant strength and conditioning – Pierre Ngo

=== Final roster ===
2022 Denver Broncos roster
Quarterbacks (QB): 11 Jarrett Guarantano; 4 Brett Rypien; 3 Russell Wilson; Running backs (RB): 36 Tyler Badie; 19 Chase Edmonds; 28 Latavius Murray; Wide receivers (WR): 9 Kendall Hinton; 10 Jerry Jeudy; 89 Brandon Johnson; 14 Courtland Sutton; 86 Freddie Swain; 15 Jalen Virgil; 12 Montrell Washington; Tight ends (TE): 83 Andrew Beck; 85 Albert Okwuegbunam; 82 Eric Saubert; 87 Eric Tomlinson	Offensive linemen (OL): 76 Calvin Anderson T; 75 Quinn Bailey G/T; 67 Christian DiLauro T; 73 Cameron Fleming T; 61 Graham Glasgow G; 77 Quinn Meinerz G; 78 Will Sherman G/T; 57 Billy Turner T; 60 Luke Wattenberg G/C; Defensive linemen (DL): 95 Elijah Garcia DE; 92 Jonathan Harris DE; 91 Matt Henningsen DE; 97 D. J. Jones NT; 98 Mike Purcell NT; 96 Eyioma Uwazurike DE; 90 DeShawn Williams DE	Linebackers (LB): 42 Nik Bonitto OLB; 56 Baron Browning OLB; 53 Jonathon Cooper OLB; 47 Josey Jewell ILB; 90 Jonathan Kongbo OLB; 49 Alex Singleton ILB; 40 Justin Strnad ILB; Defensive backs (DB): 34 Essang Bassey CB; 22 Kareem Jackson SS; 25 Lamar Jackson CB; 37 P. J. Locke FS; 27 Damarri Mathis CB; 35 Ja'Quan McMillian CB; 31 Justin Simmons FS; 2 Patrick Surtain II CB; 32 Delarrin Turner-Yell SS; 21 K'Waun Williams CB; Special teams (ST): 46 Jacob Bobenmoyer LS; 8 Brandon McManus K; 17 Corliss Waitman P	Practice squad: 84 Victor Bolden Jr. WR; 16 Tyrie Cleveland WR; 41 Kaden Davis WR; 51 Olakunle Fatukasi ILB; 65 Parker Ferguson G; 29 Faion Hicks CB; 13 Delonte Hood CB; 48 Dalton Keene TE; 38 Devon Key FS; 39 Tyreik McAllister RB; 71 George Moore T; 52 Wyatt Ray OLB; 68 Hunter Thedford T; 43 Ray Wilborn ILB; Reserve: 45 Christopher Allen OLB (IR); 59 Dakota Allen ILB (IR); 72 Garett Bolles T (IR); 26 Mike Boone RB (IR); 69 Tom Compton T (IR); -- Damarea Crockett RB (IR); 79 Lloyd Cushenberry C (IR); 23 Ronald Darby CB (IR); 80 Greg Dulcich TE (IR); 48 Mitchell Fraboni LS (IR); 5 Randy Gregory OLB (IR); 50 Jonas Griffith ILB (IR); 1 K. J. Hamler WR (IR); 93 Dre'Mont Jones DE (IR); 37 Marlon Mack RB (IR); 54 Jacob Martin OLB (IR); 94 Aaron Patrick OLB (IR); 81 Tim Patrick WR (IR); 20 Darius Phillips CB (IR); 66 Dalton Risner G (IR); 30 Caden Sterns FS (IR); 33 Javonte Williams RB (IR); Rookies in italics 53 active, 22 reserve, 14 practice squad

== Preseason ==
Week	Date	Opponent	Result	Record	Venue	Recap
1	August 13	Dallas Cowboys	W 17–7	1–0	Empower Field at Mile High	Recap
2	August 20	at Buffalo Bills	L 15–42	1–1	Highmark Stadium	Recap
3	August 27	Minnesota Vikings	W 23–13	2–1	Empower Field at Mile High	Recap

== Regular season ==
=== Schedule ===
Week	Date	Opponent	Result	Record	Venue	Recap
1	September 12	at Seattle Seahawks	**L** 16–17	0–1	Lumen Field	Recap
2	September 18	Houston Texans	**W** 16–9	1–1	Empower Field at Mile High	Recap
3	September 25	San Francisco 49ers	**W** 11–10	2–1	Empower Field at Mile High	Recap
4	October 2	at **Las Vegas Raiders**	**L** 23–32	2–2	Allegiant Stadium	Recap
5	October 6	Indianapolis Colts	**L** 9–12 (OT)	2–3	Empower Field at Mile High	Recap
6	October 17	at **Los Angeles Chargers**	**L** 16–19 (OT)	2–4	SoFi Stadium	Recap
7	October 23	New York Jets	**L** 9–16	2–5	Empower Field at Mile High	Recap
8	October 30	at Jacksonville Jaguars	**W** 21–17	3–5	(United Kingdom) Wembley Stadium (London)	Recap
9	Bye					
10	November 13	at Tennessee Titans	**L** 10–17	3–6	Nissan Stadium	Recap
11	November 20	**Las Vegas Raiders**	**L** 16–22 (OT)	3–7	Empower Field at Mile High	Recap
12	November 27	at Carolina Panthers	**L** 10–23	3–8	Bank of America Stadium	Recap
13	December 4	at Baltimore Ravens	**L** 9–10	3–9	M&T Bank Stadium	Recap
14	December 11	**Kansas City Chiefs**	**L** 28–34	3–10	Empower Field at Mile High	Recap
15	December 18	Arizona Cardinals	**W** 24–15	4–10	Empower Field at Mile High	Recap
16	December 25	at Los Angeles Rams	**L** 14–51	4–11	SoFi Stadium	Recap
17	January 1	at **Kansas City Chiefs**	**L** 24–27	4–12	Arrowhead Stadium	Recap
18	January 8	**Los Angeles Chargers**	**W** 31–28	5–12	Empower Field at Mile High	Recap

Note: Intra-division opponents are in bold text.

=== Game summaries ===
==== Week 1: at Seattle Seahawks ====
Week 1: Denver Broncos at Seattle Seahawks – Game summary

Quarter	1	2	3	4	Total
Broncos	3	10	0	3	**16**
**Seahawks**	7	10	0	0	**17**

at Lumen Field, Seattle, Washington

- Date: September 12
- Game time: 6:15 p.m. MDT/5:15 p.m. PDT
- Game weather: Sunny, 74 °F (23 °C)
- Game attendance: 68,965
- Referee: Clete Blakeman
- TV announcers (ESPN/ABC): Joe Buck, Troy Aikman and Lisa Salters
- Preview, Game Book

Game information

**First quarter**

- SEA – Will Dissly 38-yard pass from Geno Smith (Jason Myers kick), 11:26. Seahawks 7–0. **Drive: 6 plays, 70 yards, 3:34.**
- DEN – Brandon McManus 30-yard field goal, 6:55. Seahawks 7–3. **Drive: 9 plays, 77 yards, 4:31.**

**Second quarter**

- SEA – Jason Myers 49-yard field goal, 7:20. Seahawks 10–3. **Drive: 9 plays, 50 yards, 5:54.**
- DEN – Jerry Jeudy 67-yard pass from Russell Wilson (Brandon McManus kick), 5:34. Tied 10–10. **Drive: 3 plays, 75 yards, 1:46.**
- SEA – Colby Parkinson 25-yard pass from Geno Smith (Jason Myers kick), 2:24. Seahawks 17–10. **Drive: 7 plays, 75 yards, 3:10.**
- DEN – Brandon McManus 40-yard field goal, 0:00. Seahawks 17–13. **Drive: 9 plays, 57 yards, 2:24.**

**Third quarter**

- No scoring plays.

**Fourth quarter**

- DEN – Brandon McManus 26-yard field goal, 6:13. Seahawks 17–16. **Drive: 15 plays, 72 yards, 6:37.**

**Top passers**

- DEN – Russell Wilson – 29/42, 340 yards, TD
- SEA – Geno Smith – 23/28, 195 yards, 2 TD

**Top rushers**

- DEN – Melvin Gordon III – 12 rushes, 58 yards
- SEA – Rashaad Penny – 12 rushes, 60 yards

**Top receivers**

- DEN – Jerry Jeudy – 4 receptions, 102 yards, TD
- SEA – Colby Parkinson – 2 receptions, 43 yards, TD

The 2022 season opener marked Russell Wilson's return to Seattle, where he led the Seahawks to eight playoff appearances and two Super Bowl berths during his ten seasons there from 2012–2021. After his trade from the Seahawks to the Broncos in March, he became the Broncos' sixth different opening day starting quarterback in as many seasons. This also marked Nathaniel Hackett's debut as the Broncos' head coach.

The teams alternated scoring in the first half. The Seahawks took the early lead on the game's opening drive, with quarterback Geno Smith connecting on a 38-yard touchdown pass to tight end Will Dissly in the first quarter. Placekicker Brandon McManus got the Broncos on the scoring board with a 30-yard field goal. The Seahawks increased their lead to 10–3 midway through the second quarter with a 49-yard field goal. The Broncos then pulled even with the Seahawks, when Wilson threw his first touchdown pass as a Bronco—a 67-yarder to wide receiver Jerry Jeudy. However, the Seahawks responded, with Smith's second touchdown of the first half—a 25-yarder to tight end Colby Parkinson prior to the 2-minute warning. The Broncos' defense held the Seahawks scoreless for the remainder of the game. McManus added a 30-yard field goal as time expired in the first half to narrow the Seahawks' lead to 17–13.

The Broncos had the ball on the 1-yard line on back-to-back drives in the third quarter, but suffered two very costly turnovers when running backs Melvin Gordon and Javonte Williams fumbled on the goal line on consecutive possessions. In between the two fumbles, Broncos' linebacker Randy Gregory forced a fumble off Seahawks' wide receiver D. K. Metcalf near midfield, which was recovered by safety Justin Simmons. After a scoreless third quarter, the Broncos started their first possession of the fourth quarter with 12:50 remaining in the game, but failed to reach the end zone after a 1st-and goal at the 3-yard line. McManus kicked a 26-yard field goal to narrow the Seahawks' lead to 17–16 with 6:16 left. After the defense forced a three-and-out from the Seahawks' offense, the Broncos started their final drive at their own 22-yard line with 4:02 remaining. Wilson marched the Broncos down the field and faced a 4th-and-5 on the Seahawks' 46-yard line with 56 seconds to play. Instead of calling a timeout, Hackett decided to let the clock run down to 20 seconds and called his first timeout to send out placekicker Brandon McManus to try a 64-yard game-winning field goal, which he missed wide left, sealing the win for the Seahawks. Hackett's decision to burn over 40 seconds of game clock to kick a 64-yard field goal instead of letting the offense try to convert and move the ball further down the field was widely criticized. The Broncos' offense failed to reach the end zone on all three of their red zone trips.

==== Week 2: vs. Houston Texans ====
Week 2: Houston Texans at Denver Broncos – Game summary

Quarter	1	2	3	4	Total
Texans	3	3	3	0	**9**
**Broncos**	3	3	0	10	**16**

at Empower Field at Mile High, Denver, Colorado

- Date: September 18
- Game time: 2:25 p.m. MDT
- Game weather: Sunny, 77 °F (25 °C)
- Game attendance: 73,083
- Referee: Carl Cheffers
- TV announcers (CBS): Andrew Catalon, James Lofton and Michael Grady
- Recap, Game Book

Game information

**First quarter**

- DEN – Brandon McManus 20-yard field goal, 5:30. Broncos 3–0. **Drive: 8 plays, 63 yards, 2:18.**
- HOU – Kaʻimi Fairbairn 40-yard field goal, 2:19. Tied 3–3. **Drive: 10 plays, 54 yards, 3:11.**

**Second quarter**

- HOU – Kaʻimi Fairbairn 44-yard field goal, 7:20. Texans 6–3. **Drive: 10 plays, 54 yards, 5:32.**
- DEN – Brandon McManus 24-yard field goal, 0:20. Tied 6–6. **Drive: 9 plays, 70 yards, 3:44.**

**Third quarter**

- HOU – Kaʻimi Fairbairn 24-yard field goal, 8:33. Texans 9–6. **Drive: 11 plays, 39 yards, 5:09.**

**Fourth quarter**

- DEN – Eric Saubert 22-yard pass from Russell Wilson (Brandon McManus kick), 12:37. Broncos 13–9. **Drive: 6 plays, 62 yards, 3:56.**
- DEN – Brandon McManus 50-yard field goal, 3:36. Broncos 16–9. **Drive: 12 plays, 54 yards, 6:12.**

**Top passers**

- HOU – Davis Mills – 19/38, 177 yards
- DEN – Russell Wilson – 14/31, 219 yards, TD, INT

**Top rushers**

- HOU – Dameon Pierce – 15 rushes, 69 yards
- DEN – Javonte Williams – 15 rushes, 75 yards

**Top receivers**

- HOU – Nico Collins – 4 receptions, 58 yards
- DEN – Courtland Sutton – 7 receptions, 122 yards

Through the midway point of the third quarter, all of the scoring came courtesy of the placekickers—40-, 44- and 24-yard field goals by the Texans' Kaʻimi Fairbairn, and 24- and 50-yard field goals by the Broncos' Brandon McManus. The 24-yard field goal by Fairbairn occurred after an interception of Broncos' quarterback Russell Wilson on the first possession of the first half. The Broncos took the lead for good early in the fourth quarter, with Wilson connecting on a 22-yard touchdown pass to tight end Eric Saubert—the game's only touchdown. After forcing a Texans' punt, McManus added a 50-yard field goal with 3:36 remaining in the game. The Broncos' defense forced two Texans' turnovers on downs, ending their rally attempt, and in the process, held the Texans to 234 total yards, helping Nathaniel Hackett earning his first win as Broncos head coach.

==== Week 3: vs. San Francisco 49ers ====
Week 3: San Francisco 49ers at Denver Broncos – Game summary

Quarter	1	2	3	4	Total
49ers	7	0	0	3	**10**
**Broncos**	0	3	2	6	**11**

at Empower Field at Mile High, Denver, Colorado

- Date: September 25
- Game time: 6:20 p.m. MDT
- Game weather: Clear, 73 °F (23 °C)
- Game attendance: 75,256
- Referee: Shawn Hochuli
- TV announcers (NBC): Mike Tirico, Cris Collinsworth and Melissa Stark
- Recap, Game Book

Game information

**First quarter**

- SF – Brandon Aiyuk 3-yard pass from Jimmy Garoppolo (Robbie Gould kick), 7:56. 49ers 7–0. **Drive: 6 plays, 75 yards, 3:11.**

**Second quarter**

- DEN – Brandon McManus 55-yard field goal, 11:56. 49ers 7–3. **Drive: 8 plays, 57 yards, 3:11.**

**Third quarter**

- DEN – Jimmy Garoppolo sacked by Mike Purcell in the end-zone, safety, 9:53. 49ers 7–5. **Drive: 2 plays, -2 yards, 0:38.**

**Fourth quarter**

- SF – Robbie Gould 51-yard field goal, 14:10. 49ers 10–5. **Drive: 4 plays, 8 yards, 1:19.**
- DEN – Melvin Gordon 1-yard run (pass failed), 4:10. Broncos 11–10. **Drive: 12 plays, 80 yards, 6:04.**

**Top passers**

- SF – Jimmy Garoppolo – 18/29, 211 yards, TD, INT
- DEN – Russell Wilson – 20/33, 184 yards

**Top rushers**

- SF – Jeff Wilson – 12 rushes, 75 yards
- DEN – Javonte Williams – 15 rushes, 58 yards

**Top receivers**

- SF – Deebo Samuel – 5 receptions, 73 yards
- DEN – Courtland Sutton – 8 receptions, 97 yards

The Broncos' offense had ten drives that ended in a 3-and-out, but their defense stymied the 49ers throughout the entire game. The only scoring plays within the first quarter were a 3-yard touchdown pass from 49ers' quarterback Jimmy Garoppolo to wide receiver Brandon Aiyuk in the first quarter, and a 55-yard field goal by Broncos' placekicker Brandon McManus early in the second quarter. After the Broncos went 3-and-out on their first two possessions of the third quarter, the 49ers were backed up near their own goal line. Garoppolo accidentally stepped out of the back of the end zone for a safety while being pressured by Broncos' nose tackle Mike Purcell—a play which proved critical to the game's outcome. The Broncos trailed 10–5 following a 51-yard field goal by 49ers' placekicker Robbie Gould early in the 4th quarter, but finally found their rhythm on a 12-play, 80-yard drive, which running back Melvin Gordon capped off with a 1-yard touchdown run. While they failed to convert the 2-point conversion, they took an 11–10 lead with 4:13 remaining in the game. The Broncos' defense then forced two game-saving turnovers. First, Garoppolo was intercepted by linebacker Jonas Griffith, following a deflection by cornerback Kareem Jackson. Then, after the Broncos went 3-and-out just after the two-minute warning, and in the process, forcing the 49ers to burn two of their team timeouts, safety P. J. Locke forced a fumble off 49ers' running back Jeff Wilson deep in 49ers' territory, with Jackson recovering the fumble to seal the Broncos' victory.

==== Week 4: at Las Vegas Raiders ====
Week 4: Denver Broncos at Las Vegas Raiders – Game summary

Quarter	1	2	3	4	Total
Broncos	7	9	0	7	**23**
**Raiders**	3	16	3	10	**32**

at Allegiant Stadium, Paradise, Nevada

- Date: October 2
- Game time: 2:25 p.m. MDT/1:25 p.m. PDT
- Game weather: None (indoor stadium)
- Game attendance: 62,332
- Referee: Land Clark
- TV announcers (CBS): Kevin Harlan, Trent Green and Melanie Collins
- Recap, Game Book

Game information

**First quarter**

- LV – Daniel Carlson 26-yard field goal, 9:52. Raiders 3–0. **Drive: 11 plays, 60 yards, 5:08.**
- DEN – Courtland Sutton 5-yard pass from Russell Wilson (Brandon McManus kick), 2:45. Broncos 7–3. **Drive: 4 plays, 34 yards, 2:09.**

**Second quarter**

- LV – Josh Jacobs 5-yard run (Daniel Carlson kick), 11:46. Raiders 10–7. **Drive: 11 plays, 75 yards, 5:59.**
- DEN – Brandon McManus 28-yard field goal, 8:03. Tied 10–10. **Drive: 7 plays, 39 yards, 3:42.**
- LV – Amik Robertson 68-yard fumble return (kick failed), 3:15. Raiders 16–10.
- DEN – Jerry Jeudy 20-yard pass from Russell Wilson (kick failed), 1:24. Tied 16–16. **Drive: 5 plays, 75 yards, 1:51.**
- LV – Daniel Carlson 39-yard field goal, 0:00. Raiders 19–16. **Drive: 10 plays, 54 yards, 1:24.**

**Third quarter**

- LV – Daniel Carlson 22-yard field goal, 2:27. Raiders 22–16. **Drive: 10 plays, 77 yards, 4:42.**

**Fourth quarter**

- LV – Daniel Carlson 30-yard field goal, 9:50. Raiders 25–16. **Drive: 6 plays, 38 yards, 3:15.**
- DEN – Russell Wilson 3-yard run (Brandon McManus kick), 7:16. Raiders 25–23. **Drive: 6 plays, 75 yards, 2:34.**
- LV – Josh Jacobs 7-yard run (Daniel Carlson kick), 2:02. Raiders 32–23. **Drive: 10 plays, 75 yards, 5:14.**

**Top passers**

- DEN – Russell Wilson – 17/25, 237 yards, 2 TD
- LV – Derek Carr – 21/34, 188 yards

**Top rushers**

- DEN – Russell Wilson – 4 rushes, 29 yards, TD
- LV – Josh Jacobs – 28 rushes, 144 yards, 2 TD

**Top receivers**

- DEN – K. J. Hamler – 1 reception, 55 yards
- LV – Davante Adams – 9 receptions, 101 yards

After a 30-yard field goal by Raiders' placekicker Daniel Carlson early in the first quarter, the Broncos responded, with a 5-yard touchdown pass from quarterback Russell Wilson to wide receiver Courtland Sutton. It would be their only lead of the game, as a 5-yard touchdown run by running back Josh Jacobs early in the second quarter gave the Raiders the lead. Like the previous three games, red zone struggles continued to plague the Broncos, as they were forced to settle on a 28-yard field goal by placekicker Brandon McManus to tie the game at 10–10. After forcing a Raiders' punt on a 3-and-out, disaster struck on the Broncos' next possession just as they were hoping to re-take the lead. Running back Melvin Gordon fumbled, and Raiders' cornerback Amik Robertson recovered the football, returning it for a 68-yard touchdown (with a missed extra point attempt). The Broncos pulled even with the Raiders, with a 5-play, 75-yard drive, culminating in a 20-yard touchdown pass from Wilson to wide receiver Jerry Jeudy. McManus missed short on the extra-point attempt that would have given the Broncos the lead. The Raiders then drove down the field that resulted in a 39-yard field goal by Carlson for a 19–16 lead just before halftime. A 22-yard field goal by Carlson was the only scoring play of the third quarter. The Broncos' running game struggled after running back Javonte Williams was forced to leave the game with, what turned out to be, a season-ending knee injury. After the Broncos went 3-and-out on the first possession of the fourth quarter, Carlson's fourth field goal of the game—from 30 yards out, gave the Raiders a 25–16 lead. The Broncos drove down the field, culminating a 3-yard rushing touchdown by Wilson to narrow the Raiders' lead to 25–23 with 7:19 remaining in the game. The drive was aided by a 55-yard completion from Wilson to wide receiver K. J. Hamler to the Raiders' 3-yard line, after two holding penalties backed up the Broncos with a 1st-and-30 from their own 19-yard line. However, the Broncos' defense was unable to hold the Raiders a pair of 3rd-down conversions. Carr scrambled for 9 yards on a critical 3-and-6 for a first down, and backup running back Zamir White scrambled for 22 yards on a 3rd-and-2 from the Broncos' 29-yard line. On the next play, Jacobs rushed for a 7-yard game-clinching touchdown. Wilson rushed for 5 yards on their first play from scrimmage just before the 2-minute warning, then threw three straight incomplete passes to end the Broncos' rally attempt.

==== Week 5: vs. Indianapolis Colts ====
Week 5: Indianapolis Colts at Denver Broncos – Game summary

Quarter	1	2	3	4	OT	Total
**Colts**	0	3	3	3	3	**12**
Broncos	3	3	3	0	0	**9**

at Empower Field at Mile High, Denver, Colorado

- Date: October 6
- Game time: 6:15 p.m. MDT
- Game weather: Partly cloudy, 69 °F (21 °C)
- Game attendance: 71,702
- Referee: Brad Rogers
- TV announcers (KMGH/Prime Video): Al Michaels, Kirk Herbstreit and Kaylee Hartung
- Recap, Game Book

Game information

**First quarter**

- DEN – Brandon McManus 33-yard field goal, 9:28. Broncos 3–0. **Drive: 10 plays, 49 yards, 4:09.**

**Second quarter**

- DEN – Brandon McManus 44-yard field goal, 10:58. Broncos 6–0. **Drive: 10 plays, 40 yards, 4:14.**
- IND – Chase McLaughlin 52-yard field goal, 0:12. Broncos 6–3. **Drive: 14 plays, 52 yards, 3:36.**

**Third quarter**

- IND – Chase McLaughlin 51-yard field goal, 8:51. Tied 6–6. **Drive: 9 plays, 34 yards, 3:57.**
- DEN – Brandon McManus 45-yard field goal, 3:19. Broncos 9–6. **Drive: 4 plays, 0 yards, 0:19.**

**Fourth quarter**

- IND – Chase McLaughlin 31-yard field goal, 0:05. Tied 9–9. **Drive: 10 plays, 67 yards, 2:08.**

**Overtime**

- IND – Chase McLaughlin 48-yard field goal, 5:50. Colts 12–9. **Drive: 8 plays, 45 yards, 4:10.**

**Top passers**

- IND – Matt Ryan – 26/41, 251 yards, INT
- DEN – Russell Wilson – 21/39, 274 yards, 2 INT

**Top rushers**

- IND – Deon Jackson – 13 rushes, 62 yards
- DEN – Melvin Gordon – 15 rushes, 54 yards

**Top receivers**

- IND – Alec Pierce – 8 receptions, 81 yards
- DEN – Courtland Sutton – 5 receptions, 74 yards

All of the scoring came by way of the placekickers—Brandon McManus (Broncos) and Chase McLaughlin (Colts). McManus gave the Broncos a 6–0 lead with a 33-yarder in the first quarter, followed by a 44-yarder early in the second quarter. McLaughlin got the Colts on the board just before the halftime, with a 52-yard field goal, then pulled the Colts even with the Broncos, with a 51-yarder midway through the third quarter. McManus' third attempt of the game—from 34 yards out—was blocked by Colts' defensive tackle Grover Stewart—a play that would prove to be critical to the game's outcome. Following an interception of Colts' quarterback Matt Ryan by safety Caden Sterns, McManus redeemed himself with a 45-yarder late in the third quarter. The Broncos advanced into field goal range early in the fourth quarter; however, they blew a chance to add to their lead, when quarterback Russell Wilson was intercepted by Colts' safety Rodney Thomas II near the goal line. The Broncos' defense was able to stop the Colts from advancing past midfield on this possession and the next. The Broncos held a 9–6 lead with 6:47 remaining in the game, and marched down the field, hoping to either add to their lead or run out the clock. Wilson completed a 9-yard pass to tight end Eric Saubert, after facing a 4th-and-1 at the Colts' 28-yard line, forcing the Colts to use all of their team timeouts on defense. However, three plays later, Wilson was intercepted by Colts' cornerback Stephon Gilmore in the end zone for a touchback, on a pass intended for wide receiver Tyrie Cleveland. With 2:19 remaining in the fourth quarter, the Colts marched down the field, and McLaughlin sent the game to overtime with a 31-yard field goal. The Colts won the overtime coin toss, and grabbed a 12–9 lead, with McLaughlin's fourth field goal, from 48 yards out midway through overtime. The Broncos reached the Colts' 5-yard line in only six plays, and faced a 4th-and-1. However, instead of tying the game, they decided to either go for a new set of downs or try to win with a touchdown. However, Wilson's pass intended for wide receiver Courtland Sutton was broken up by Gilmore, resulting in a gut-wrenching loss for the Broncos. Wilson missed a wide-open K. J. Hamler on the game's final play. It was later revealed that Wilson had playing with a partially torn lat in his throwing shoulder since the second quarter of the Broncos' previous game against the Raiders.

==== Week 6: at Los Angeles Chargers ====
Week 6: Denver Broncos at Los Angeles Chargers – Game summary

Quarter	1	2	3	4	OT	Total
Broncos	10	3	0	3	0	**16**
**Chargers**	0	10	3	3	3	**19**

at SoFi Stadium, Inglewood, California

- Date: October 17
- Game time: 6:15 p.m. MDT/5:15 p.m. PDT
- Game weather: None (retractable roof closed)
- Game attendance: 70,240
- Referee: Ronald Torbert
- TV announcers (KMGH/ESPN): Joe Buck, Troy Aikman and Lisa Salters
- Recap, Game Book

Game information

**First quarter**

- DEN – Brandon McManus 51-yard field goal, 7:20. Broncos 3–0. **Drive: 8 plays, 46 yards, 5:11.**
- DEN – Greg Dulcich 39-yard pass from Russell Wilson (Brandon McManus kick), 1:49. Broncos 10–0. **Drive: 7 plays, 84 yards, 3:41.**

**Second quarter**

- LAC – Austin Ekeler 6-yard run (Dustin Hopkins kick), 9:09. Broncos 10–7. **Drive: 15 plays, 82 yards, 7:40.**
- LAC – Dustin Hopkins 37-yard field goal, 0:53. Tied 10–10. **Drive: 14 plays, 69 yards, 6:36.**
- DEN – Brandon McManus 27-yard field goal, 0:00. Broncos 13–10. **Drive: 7 plays, 66 yards, 0:53.**

**Third quarter**

- LAC – Dustin Hopkins 31-yard field goal, 9:08. Tied 13–13. **Drive: 9 plays, 60 yards, 4:19.**

**Fourth quarter**

- DEN – Brandon McManus 48-yard field goal, 8:21. Broncos 16–13. **Drive: 4 plays, 0 yards, 2:07.**
- LAC – Dustin Hopkins 35-yard field goal, 3:58. Tied 16–16. **Drive: 10 plays, 58 yards, 4:23.**

**Overtime**

- LAC – Dustin Hopkins 39-yard field goal, 2:38. Chargers 19–16. **Drive: 4 plays, 7 yards, 2:08.**

**Top passers**

- DEN – Russell Wilson – 15/28, 188 yards, TD
- LAC – Justin Herbert – 37/57, 238 yards, INT

**Top rushers**

- DEN – Latavius Murray – 15 rushes, 66 yards
- LAC – Austin Ekeler – 14 rushes, 36 yards, TD

**Top receivers**

- DEN – Jerry Jeudy – 3 receptions, 54 yards
- LAC – Austin Ekeler – 10 receptions, 47 yards

Yet another stellar effort by the Broncos' defense was wasted by a poor performance from their offense. A 51-yard field goal by placekicker Brandon McManus, followed by a 39-yard touchdown pass from quarterback Russell Wilson to rookie tight end Greg Dulcich gave the Broncos a 10–0 lead in the first quarter. However, the offense struggled through the remainder of the game. The Chargers responded in the second quarter, with a 6-yard touchdown run by running back Austin Ekeler and a 37-yard field goal by placekicker Dustin Hopkins. A 27-yard field goal by McManus gave the Broncos a 13–10 lead at halftime. After the Broncos went 3-and-out on the opening possession of the second half, Hopkins tied the game with a 31-yard field goal. The Chargers faced a 4th-and-2 at the Broncos' 29-yard line; however, the Broncos' defense came up with a stop, forcing an incomplete pass off Chargers' quarterback Justin Herbert. On the Chargers' next possession, Herbert was intercepted by linebacker Baron Browning, giving the Broncos good field position at the Chargers' 30-yard line. However, the Broncos failed to gain any yardage, and McManus kicked a 47-yard field goal to give the Broncos a 16–13 lead midway through the fourth quarter. The Chargers responded once again, and Hopkins' third field goal of the game—from 35 yards out, tied the game at 16–16 with 4:02 remaining in the fourth quarter. Neither team advanced past midfield, sending the game to overtime. The Broncos went 3-and-out on both of their overtime possessions, and Hopkins later kicked the game-winning 43-yard field goal. Wilson threw for 188 yards, but 173 of those came in the first half, and Wilson played through a hamstring injury during the second half.

==== Week 7: vs. New York Jets ====
Week 7: New York Jets at Denver Broncos – Game summary

Quarter	1	2	3	4	Total
**Jets**	7	3	0	6	**16**
Broncos	6	3	0	0	**9**

at Empower Field at Mile High, Denver, Colorado

- Date: October 23
- Game time: 2:05 p.m. MDT
- Game weather: 64 °F (18 °C)
- Game attendance: 70,786
- Referee: Bill Vinovich
- TV announcers (CBS): Ian Eagle, Charles Davis and Evan Washburn
- Recap, Game Book

Game information

**First quarter**

- NYJ – Breece Hall 62-yard run (Greg Zuerlein kick), 7:34. Jets 7–0. **Drive: 3 plays, 73 yards, 1:06.**
- DEN – Latavius Murray 2-yard run (kick failed, wide right), 1:33. Jets 7–6. **Drive: 13 plays, 75 yards, 6:01.**

**Second quarter**

- DEN – Brandon McManus 44-yard field goal, 3:37. Broncos 9–7. **Drive: 11 plays, 73 yards, 6:05.**
- NYJ – Greg Zuerlein 45-yard field goal, 0:00. Jets 10–9. **Drive: 10 plays, 48 yards, 3:37.**

**Third quarter**

- No scoring plays.

**Fourth quarter**

- NYJ – Greg Zuerlein 33-yard field goal, 12:49. Jets 13–9. **Drive: 7 plays, 21 yards, 3:35.**
- NYJ – Greg Zuerlein 40-yard field goal, 4:35. Jets 16–9. **Drive: 10 plays, 50 yards, 6:12.**

**Top passers**

- NYJ – Zach Wilson – 16/26, 121 yards
- DEN – Brett Rypien – 24/46, 225 yards, INT

**Top rushers**

- NYJ – Breece Hall – 4 rushes, 72 yards, TD
- DEN – Melvin Gordon – 11 rushes, 33 yards

**Top receivers**

- NYJ – Michael Carter – 2 receptions, 45 yards
- DEN – Jerry Jeudy – 7 receptions, 96 yards

The Broncos fell behind early, after Jets' running back Breece Hall ran for a 62-yard touchdown. The Broncos responded late in the first quarter, with a 2-yard run by running back Latavius Murray. However, placekicker Brandon McManus missed wide-right on the extra point attempt, and again on a 56-yard field goal attempt early in the second quarter. McManus later atoned for his missed kicks, with a 44-yard field goal to give the Broncos their only lead of the game, at 10–9. However, the Broncos were held scoreless for the remainder of the game, and the Jets took the lead for good, with a 45-yard field goal by placekicker Greg Zuerlein at the end of the first half. Quarterback Brett Rypien, starting in place of the injured Russell Wilson, was intercepted by Jets' safety Lamarcus Joyner, resulting in the Jets adding to their lead, with a 33-yard field goal by Zuerlein early in the fourth quarter. After the Broncos went 3-and-out, the Jets increased their lead to 16–9, with a 40-yard field goal by Zuerlein with 4:39 remaining in the game. The Broncos faced a 4th-and-3 at the Jets' 25-yard line at the two-minute warning, but Rypien's deep pass intended for wide receiver Courtland Sutton was incomplete. The Broncos' defense forced a 3-and-out from the Jets, and had one last offensive possession with 1:30 remaining in the game, but turned the football over on downs after two first downs and reaching midfield.

==== Week 8: at Jacksonville Jaguars ====
NFL London games

Week 8: Denver Broncos at Jacksonville Jaguars – Game summary

Quarter	1	2	3	4	Total
**Broncos**	0	7	7	7	**21**
Jaguars	7	3	0	7	**17**

at Wembley Stadium, London, England

- Date: October 30
- Game time: 1:30 p.m. GMT/7:30 a.m. MDT
- Game weather: Mostly cloudy, 61 °F (16 °C)
- Game attendance: 86,215
- Referee: Adrian Hill
- TV announcers (KMGH/ESPN+): Steve Levy, Louis Riddick, Dan Orlovsky and Laura Rutledge
- Recap, Game Book

Game information

**First quarter**

- JAX – Evan Engram 22-yard pass from Trevor Lawrence (Riley Patterson kick), 7:40. Jaguars 7–0. **Drive: 5 plays, 37 yards, 2:56.**

**Second quarter**

- JAX – Riley Patterson 37-yard field goal, 8:43. Jaguars 10–0. **Drive: 6 plays, 54 yards, 2:09.**
- DEN – Jerry Jeudy 6-yard pass from Russell Wilson (Brandon McManus kick), 2:44. Jaguars 10–7. **Drive: 11 plays, 75 yards, 5:59.**

**Third quarter**

- DEN – Melvin Gordon 1-yard run (Brandon McManus kick), 5:07. Broncos 14–10. **Drive: 9 plays, 98 yards, 4:22.**

**Fourth quarter**

- JAX – Travis Etienne 1-yard run (Riley Patterson kick), 3:54. Jaguars 17–14. **Drive: 6 plays, 47 yards, 3:12.**
- DEN – Latavius Murray 2-yard run (Brandon McManus kick), 1:43. Broncos 21–17. **Drive: 7 plays, 80 yards, 2:11.**

**Top passers**

- DEN – Russell Wilson – 18/30, 252 yards, TD, INT
- JAX – Trevor Lawrence – 18/31, 133 yards, TD, 2 INT

**Top rushers**

- DEN – Latavius Murray – 14 rushes, 46 yards, TD
- JAX – Travis Etienne – 24 rushes, 156 yards, TD

**Top receivers**

- DEN – Greg Dulcich – 4 receptions, 87 yards
- JAX – Evan Engram – 4 receptions, 55 yards, TD

This was the Broncos' second appearance in the International Series in London—the other occurred in 2010. After quarterback Russell Wilson was intercepted on the Broncos' second possession, the Jaguars capitalized, with quarterback Trevor Lawrence throwing a 22-yard touchdown pass to tight end Evan Engram. The Jaguars were attempting to add to lead, with a 1st-and-goal, but Broncos' safety Justin Simmons intercepted a pass in the end zone from Lawrence intended for wide receiver Marvin Jones. The Jaguars eventually added to their lead on their next possession, with a 37-yard field goal by placekicker Riley Patterson. The Broncos finally got on the scoreboard late in the first half, with Wilson connecting with wide receiver Jerry Jeudy on a 6-yard touchdown pass, and later took the lead in the third quarter, with running back Melvin Gordon rushing for a 1-yard touchdown. Following several punt exchanges, the Jaguars took a 17–14 lead, with running back Travis Etienne rushing for a 1-yard touchdown. With 3:54 remaining in the game, Wilson engineered a fourth quarter comeback, culminating in a 2-yard touchdown run by running Latavius Murray with 1:47 remaining. After a touchback on the kickoff, the Broncos' defense subdued the Jaguars' rally attempt, as Lawrence was intercepted by cornerback K'Waun Williams on the first play from scrimmage.

==== Week 10: at Tennessee Titans ====
Week 10: Denver Broncos at Tennessee Titans – Game summary

Quarter	1	2	3	4	Total
Broncos	0	10	0	0	**10**
**Titans**	0	7	7	3	**17**

at Nissan Stadium, Nashville, Tennessee

- Date: November 13
- Game time: 12:00 p.m. CST/11:00 a.m. MST
- Game weather: Cloudy, 35 °F (2 °C)
- Game attendance: 69,240
- Referee: Scott Novak
- TV announcers (CBS): Andrew Catalon, James Lofton and Amanda Renner
- Recap, Game Book

Game information

**First quarter**

- No scoring plays.

**Second quarter**

- DEN – Jalen Virgil 66-yard pass from Russell Wilson (Brandon McManus kick), 8:21. Broncos 7–0. **Drive: 6 plays, 80 yards, 3:00.**
- DEN – Brandon McManus 39-yard field goal, 2:23. Broncos 10–0. **Drive: 9 plays, 41 yards, 3:55.**
- TEN – Nick Westbrook-Ikhine 9-yard pass from Ryan Tannehill (Randy Bullock kick), 0:12. Broncos 10–7. **Drive: 9 plays, 75 yards, 2:11.**

**Third quarter**

- TEN – Nick Westbrook-Ikhine 63-yard pass from Ryan Tannehill (Randy Bullock kick), 5:14. Titans 14–10. **Drive: 3 plays, 80 yards, 1:39.**

**Fourth quarter**

- TEN – Randy Bullock 35-yard field goal, 2:59. Titans 17–10. **Drive: 10 plays, 63 yards, 3:52.**

**Top passers**

- DEN – Russell Wilson – 21/42, 286 yards, TD, INT
- TEN – Ryan Tannehill – 19/36, 255 yards, 2 TD

**Top rushers**

- DEN – Latavius Murray – 9 rushes, 24 yards
- TEN – Derrick Henry – 19 rushes, 53 yards

**Top receivers**

- DEN – Courtland Sutton – 6 receptions, 66 yards
- TEN – Nick Westbrook-Ikhine – 5 receptions, 119 yards, 2 TD

The Broncos' entire scoring output occurred in the second quarter—a 66-yard touchdown pass from quarterback Russell Wilson to wide receiver Jalen Virgil, along with a 39-yard field goal by placekicker Brandon McManus. The Titans got on the scoreboard just before halftime, with quarterback Ryan Tannehill connecting on a 9-yard touchdown pass to wide receiver Nick Westbrook-Ikhine in the corner of the end zone. The Titans grabbed the lead in the third quarter, with Tannehill throwing a 63-yard touchdown pass to Westbrook-Ikhine by way of a flea-flicker. A 35-yard field goal by placekicker Randy Bullock increased the Titans' lead to 17–10 with three minutes remaining in the fourth quarter. The Broncos' punted on their first five possessions of the second half, failing to advance past their own 42-yard line on four possessions. Wilson tried to engineer a rally, and the Broncos faced a 4th-and-8 at the Titans' 25 line with 20 seconds remaining. However, Wilson was intercepted by Titans' cornerback Terrance Mitchell near the goal line, ending the Broncos' rally attempt.

==== Week 11: vs. Las Vegas Raiders ====
Week 11: Las Vegas Raiders at Denver Broncos – Game summary

Quarter	1	2	3	4	OT	Total
**Raiders**	0	7	3	6	6	**22**
Broncos	7	3	0	6	0	**16**

at Empower Field at Mile High, Denver, Colorado

- Date: November 20
- Game time: 2:05 p.m. MST
- Game weather: Sunny, 46 °F (8 °C)
- Game attendance: 69,064
- Referee: Shawn Smith
- TV announcers (Fox): Adam Amin, Mark Schlereth and Kristina Pink
- Recap, Game Book

Game information

**First quarter**

- DEN – Latavius Murray 1-yard run (Brandon McManus kick), 6:22. Broncos 7–0. **Drive: 7 plays, 92 yards, 3:30**

**Second quarter**

- DEN – Brandon McManus 48-yard field goal, 9:19. Broncos 10–0. **Drive: 8 plays, 34 yards, 3:07.**
- LV – Davante Adams 31-yard pass from Derek Carr (Daniel Carlson kick), 5:36. Broncos 10–7. **Drive: 8 plays, 75 yards, 3:43.**

**Third quarter**

- LV – Daniel Carlson 52-yard field goal, 10:37. Tied 10–10. **Drive: 5 plays, 20 yards, 2:15.**

**Fourth quarter**

- DEN – Brandon McManus 52-yard field goal, 14:56. Broncos 13–10. **Drive: 9 plays, 38 yards, 4:39.**
- LV – Daniel Carlson 57-yard field goal, 7:06. Tied 13–13. **Drive: 10 plays, 26 yards, 4:56.**
- DEN – Brandon McManus 48-yard field goal, 3:30. Broncos 16–13. **Drive: 8 plays, 52 yards, 3:36.**
- LV – Daniel Carlson 25-yard field goal, 0:16. Tied 16–16. **Drive: 7 plays, 71 yards, 1:27.**

**Overtime**

- LV – Davante Adams 35-yard pass from Derek Carr, 8:24. Raiders 22–16. **Drive: 3 plays, 67 yards, 1:36.**

**Top passers**

- LV – Derek Carr – 23/37, 307 yards, 2 TD
- DEN – Russell Wilson – 24/31, 247 yards

**Top rushers**

- LV – Josh Jacobs – 24 rushes, 109 yards
- DEN – Latavius Murray – 17 rushes, 49 yards, TD

**Top receivers**

- LV – Davante Adams – 7 receptions, 141 yards, 2 TD
- DEN – Courtland Sutton – 5 receptions, 80 yards

The Broncos reached the end zone on their opening possession, with a 1-yard touchdown run by running back Latavius Murray, and placekicker Brandon McManus gave the Broncos a 10–0 lead, with a 48-yard field goal early in the second quarter. In between, Raiders' placekicker Daniel Carlson missed wide right on a 46-yard field goal attempt, but a 31-yard touchdown pass from quarterback Derek Carr to wide receiver Davante Adams put the Raiders on the scoreboard. The Broncos marched down the field, and were attempting to add to their lead just before halftime; however, McManus' field goal attempt from 25 yards out was blocked by Raiders' defensive end Maxx Crosby. After the Broncos' went three-and-out to begin the second half, a 52-yard field goal by Carlson tied the game at 10–10. After an exchange of punts, McManus countered with a 52-yard field goal of his own at the beginning of the fourth quarter. Each team went three-and-out on their next offensive possessions, and a 57-yard field goal by Carlson tied the game at 13–13. McManus responded, with a 48-yard field goal to give the Broncos a 16–13 lead with 3:34 remaining in the game. After a forcing a three-and-out, the Broncos were attempting to run out the clock, but only earned one first down and were forced to punt just after the two-minute warning. The Broncos' defense was unable to stop the Raiders, as Carlson kicked a 25-yard field goal to send the game to overtime tied a 16–16. The Raiders' game-tying drive was aided by two deep pass completions from Carr—a 21-yarder to wide receiver Keelan Cole, and from midfield, a 43-yarder to running back Josh Jacobs. The Raiders won the overtime coin toss, and on the third play from scrimmage, Carr threw the game-winning 35-yard touchdown pass to Adams.

==== Week 12: at Carolina Panthers ====
Week 12: Denver Broncos at Carolina Panthers – Game summary

Quarter	1	2	3	4	Total
Broncos	0	3	0	7	**10**
**Panthers**	7	3	7	6	**23**

at Bank of America Stadium, Charlotte, North Carolina

- Date: November 27
- Game time: 1:00 p.m. EST/11:00 a.m. MST
- Game weather: Cloudy, 65 °F (18 °C)
- Game attendance: 70,644
- Referee: Clay Martin
- TV announcers (Fox): Chris Myers, Robert Smith and Jen Hale
- Recap, Game Book

Game information

**First quarter**

- CAR – D. J. Moore 5-yard pass from Sam Darnold (Eddy Piñeiro kick), 0:30. Panthers 7–0. **Drive: 11 plays, 71 yards, 7:00.**

**Second quarter**

- DEN – Brandon McManus 27-yard field goal, 10:11. Panthers 7–3. **Drive: 10 plays, 31 yards, 5:16.**
- CAR – Eddy Piñeiro 42-yard field goal, 4:42. Panthers 10–3. **Drive: 10 plays, 51 yards, 5:29.**

**Third quarter**

- CAR – Sam Darnold 2-yard run (Eddy Piñeiro kick), 7:21. Panthers 17–3. **Drive: 10 plays, 72 yards, 6:13.**

**Fourth quarter**

- CAR – Eddy Piñeiro 26-yard field goal, 13:33. Panthers 20–3. **Drive: 7 plays, 67 yards, 2:19.**
- CAR – Eddy Piñeiro 36-yard field goal, 8:59. Panthers 23–3. **Drive: 7 plays, 17 yards, 4:25.**
- DEN – Brandon Johnson 1-yard pass from Russell Wilson (Brandon McManus kick), 3:19. Panthers 23–10. **Drive: 14 plays, 77 yards, 5:40.**

**Top passers**

- DEN – Russell Wilson – 19/35, 142 yards, TD
- CAR – Sam Darnold – 11/19, 164 yards, TD

**Top rushers**

- DEN – Latavius Murray – 13 rushes, 92 yards
- CAR – D'Onta Foreman – 24 rushes, 113 yards

**Top receivers**

- DEN – Courtland Sutton – 6 receptions, 75 yards
- CAR – D. J. Moore – 4 receptions, 103 yards, TD

The Broncos' struggled offensively throughout the entire game, in a 23–10 loss to the Panthers. The Broncos trailed 23–3 midway through the fourth quarter, and failed to advance past their own 38-yard line in seven of their first ten possessions. The only scoring play came by way of a 27-yard field goal by placekicker Brandon McManus early in the second quarter, after a Panthers' fumble on a punt return. In the other two possessions in which the Broncos' found themselves past midfield, quarterback Russell Wilson was strip-sacked after reaching the Panthers' 23-yard line, and McManus missed wide left on a 56-yard field goal attempt at the end of the first half. The Broncos finally reached the end zone at the 3:24 mark of the fourth quarter, with Wilson throwing a 1-yard touchdown pass to undrafted rookie wide receiver Brandon Johnson. The Broncos' subsequent onside kick attempt was successful but earned a total of 0 yards in 4 downs. Defensively, the Broncos surrendered two touchdowns to Panthers' quarterback Sam Darnold—one passing and one rushing, as well as three field goals by placekicker Eddy Piñeiro.

==== Week 13: at Baltimore Ravens ====
Week 13: Denver Broncos at Baltimore Ravens – Game summary

Quarter	1	2	3	4	Total
Broncos	3	3	3	0	**9**
**Ravens**	0	3	0	7	**10**

at M&T Bank Stadium, Baltimore, Maryland

- Date: December 4
- Game time: 1:00 p.m. EST/11:00 a.m. MST
- Game weather: Clear, 43 °F (6 °C)
- Game attendance: 70,443
- Referee: Alex Kemp
- TV announcers (CBS): Kevin Harlan, Trent Green and Melanie Collins
- Recap, Game Book

Game information

**First quarter**

- DEN – Brandon McManus 52-yard field goal, 9:03. Broncos 3–0. **Drive: 11 plays, 49 yards, 5:57.**

**Second quarter**

- BAL – Justin Tucker 26-yard field goal, 5:55. Tied 3–3. **Drive: 10 plays, 62 yards, 5:02.**
- DEN – Brandon McManus 41-yard field goal, 0:37. Broncos 6–3. **Drive: 8 plays, 70 yards, 2:18.**

**Third quarter**

- DEN – Brandon McManus 50-yard field goal, 3:58. Broncos 9–3. **Drive: 4 plays, 8 yards, 2:01.**

**Fourth quarter**

- BAL – Tyler Huntley 2-yard run (Justin Tucker kick), 0:28. Ravens 10–9. **Drive: 16 plays, 91 yards, 4:34.**

**Top passers**

- DEN – Russell Wilson – 17/22, 189 yards
- BAL – Tyler Huntley – 27/32, 187 yards, INT

**Top rushers**

- DEN – Latavius Murray – 17 rushes, 47 yards
- BAL – Tyler Huntley – 10 rushes, 41 yards, TD

**Top receivers**

- DEN – Greg Dulcich – 6 receptions, 85 yards
- BAL – Mark Andrews – 4 receptions, 53 yards

The Broncos failed to score a touchdown for the third time in 2022, settling for three field goals by placekicker Brandon McManus, going 2-of-12 on third down and never advancing any further than the Ravens' 23-yard line. The Broncos led 9–3 with five minutes remaining in the fourth quarter. The scoring play that the Broncos' defense had yielded to that point was a 26-yard field goal by Ravens' placekicker Justin Tucker in the second quarter. However, the Broncos' defense failed to protect the lead, and Ravens' backup quarterback Tyler Huntley engineered a 16-play, 91-yard game-winning drive, culminating in a 2-yard touchdown run. Huntley entered the game after starting quarterback Lamar Jackson exited with a knee injury in the first half. With 28 seconds left in the game, quarterback Russell Wilson tried to put the Broncos in position for a game-winning field goal. After a 16-yard pass completion to wide receiver Jerry Jeudy and two runs of 17 and 4 yards by Wilson, the Broncos reached the Ravens' 45-yard line with two seconds remaining after exhausting the last two of their three team timeouts. McManus attempted a long field goal from 63 yards out, but it fell short.

Notes

With the loss, the Broncos dropped to 1–7 all-time in Baltimore, including the postseason.

==== Week 14: vs. Kansas City Chiefs ====
Week 14: Kansas City Chiefs at Denver Broncos – Game summary

Quarter	1	2	3	4	Total
**Chiefs**	6	21	7	0	**34**
Broncos	0	14	7	7	**28**

at Empower Field at Mile High, Denver, Colorado

- Date: December 11
- Game time: 2:05 p.m. MST
- Game weather: Sunny, 62 °F (17 °C)
- Game attendance: 73,389
- Referee: Craig Wrolstad
- TV announcers (CBS): Ian Eagle, Charles Davis and Evan Washburn
- Recap, Game Book

Game information

**First quarter**

- KC – Harrison Butker 35-yard field goal, 10:56. Chiefs 3–0. **Drive: 8 plays, 58 yards, 4:04.**
- KC – Harrison Butker 45-yard field goal, 2:53. Chiefs 6–0. **Drive: 6 plays, 53 yards, 2:18.**

**Second quarter**

- KC – Jerick McKinnon 56-yard pass from Patrick Mahomes (Harrison Butker kick), 14:16. Chiefs 13–0. **Drive: 4 plays, 78 yards, 1:41.**
- KC – Jerick McKinnon 10-yard pass from Patrick Mahomes (Harrison Butker kick), 7:16. Chiefs 20–0. **Drive: 12 plays, 76 yards, 4:53.**
- KC – Willie Gay 47-yard interception return (Harrison Butker kick), 4:32. Chiefs 27–0.
- DEN – Jerry Jeudy 18-yard pass from Russell Wilson (Brandon McManus kick), 1:35. Chiefs 27–7. **Drive: 4 plays, 42 yards, 1:18.**
- DEN – Jerry Jeudy 5-yard pass from Russell Wilson (Brandon McManus kick), 0:09. Chiefs 27–14. **Drive: 7 plays, 60 yards, 0:57.**

**Third quarter**

- DEN – Marlon Mack 66-yard pass from Russell Wilson (Brandon McManus kick), 13:03. Chiefs 27–21. **Drive: 5 plays, 75 yards, 1:57.**
- KC – JuJu Smith-Schuster 4-yard pass from Patrick Mahomes (Harrison Butker kick), 0:38. Chiefs 34–21. **Drive: 9 plays, 72 yards, 4:28.**

**Fourth quarter**

- DEN – Jerry Jeudy 7-yard pass from Brett Rypien (Brandon McManus kick), 10:49. Chiefs 34–28. **Drive: 12 plays, 75 yards, 4:49.**

**Top passers**

- KC – Patrick Mahomes – 28/42, 352 yards, 3 TD, 3 INT
- DEN – Russell Wilson – 23/36, 247 yards, 3 TD, INT

**Top rushers**

- KC – Isiah Pacheco – 13 rushes, 70 yards
- DEN – Russell Wilson – 4 rushes, 57 yards

**Top receivers**

- KC – Jerick McKinnon – 7 receptions, 112 yards, 2 TD
- DEN – Jerry Jeudy – 8 receptions, 73 yards, 3 TD

The Broncos fell behind 27–0 to the Chiefs, following two field goals by placekicker Harrison Butker in the first quarter, two touchdown passes from quarterback Patrick Mahomes to running back Jerick McKinnon and a 47-yard interception of Broncos' quarterback Russell Wilson by linebacker Willie Gay for a touchdown. The Broncos took advantage of two interceptions by Mahomes, and within the last two minutes of the first half, Wilson threw a pair of touchdown passes to wide receiver Jerry Jeudy—from 18 and 5 yards out. The Broncos took the opening possession of the second half, and narrowed the Chiefs' lead to 27–21, with Wilson's third touchdown pass of the game—a 66-yarder to running back Marlon Mack. Following an exchange of punts, the Chiefs increased their lead to 34–21, with Mahomes' third touchdown pass of the game—a 4-yarder to wide receiver JuJu Smith-Schuster near the end of the third quarter. While the Broncos drove down the field on their next possession, Wilson suffered a concussion after a 14-yard scramble to the Chiefs' 2-yard line. Backup quarterback Brett Rypien took over for the remainder of the game, and on the same drive, he connected with Jeudy on a 7-yard touchdown pass— Jeudy's third touchdown reception of the game—to pull the Broncos within a 34–28 deficit. With six minutes remaining in the game, Mahomes was intercepted by linebacker Josey Jewell. However, just as the Broncos were hoping for a miraculous comeback from a 27–0 deficit, they failed to capitalize, as Rypien was intercepted three plays later by cornerback L'Jarius Sneed at the Chiefs' 24-yard line at the 4:34 mark of the fourth quarter. The Broncos' defense was unable to prevent the Chiefs' from running out the clock.

==== Week 15: vs. Arizona Cardinals ====
Week 15: Arizona Cardinals at Denver Broncos – Game summary

Quarter	1	2	3	4	Total
Cardinals	0	6	3	6	**15**
**Broncos**	3	0	7	14	**24**

at Empower Field at Mile High, Denver, Colorado

- Date: December 18
- Game time: 2:05 p.m. MST
- Game weather: Partly cloudy, 39 °F (4 °C)
- Game attendance: 56,786
- Referee: Jerome Boger
- TV announcers (Fox): Chris Myers, Robert Smith and Jen Hale
- Recap, Game Book

Game information

**First quarter**

- DEN – Brandon McManus 52-yard field goal, 10:27. Broncos 3–0. **Drive: 10 plays, 41 yards, 4:33.**

**Second quarter**

- ARI – Matt Prater 45-yard field goal, 10:35. Tied 3–3. **Drive: 11 plays, 45 yards, 4:57.**
- ARI – Matt Prater 50-yard field goal, 0:00. Cardinals 6–3. **Drive: 4 plays, 19 yards, 0:38.**

**Third quarter**

- ARI – Matt Prater 55-yard field goal, 8:55. Cardinals 9–3. **Drive: 11 plays, 38 yards, 6:05.**
- DEN – Marlon Mack 3-yard run (Brandon McManus kick), 5:58. Broncos 10–9. **Drive: 7 plays, 80 yards, 2:57.**

**Fourth quarter**

- DEN – Latavius Murray 10-yard run (Brandon McManus kick), 11:00. Broncos 17–9. **Drive: 6 plays, 56 yards, 2:25.**
- DEN – Eric Tomlinson 3-yard pass from Brett Rypien (Brandon McManus kick), 9:29. Broncos 24–9. **Drive: 2 plays, 5 yards, 0:41.**
- ARI – James Conner 1-yard run (pass failed), 6:01. Broncos 24–15. **Drive: 7 plays, 78 yards, 3:28.**

**Top passers**

- ARI – Colt McCoy – 13/21, 78 yards, INT
- DEN – Brett Rypien – 21/26, 196 yards, TD, INT

**Top rushers**

- ARI – James Conner – 16 rushes, 63 yards, TD
- DEN – Latavius Murray – 24 rushes, 130 yards, TD

**Top receivers**

- ARI – DeAndre Hopkins – 7 receptions, 60 yards
- DEN – Jerry Jeudy – 7 receptions, 76 yards

By the 9-minute mark of the third quarter, all of the scoring came by way of field goals. Broncos' placekicker Brandon McManus made a 52-yard field goal, but missed wide right on a 38-yard attempt—both in the first quarter, and the latter after an interception of Cardinals' quarterback Colt McCoy by safety Justin Simmons. McCoy started in place of Kyler Murray, who suffered a season-ending knee injury during the previous week. Cardinals' placekicker Matt Prater kicked three field goals—from 45 and 50 yards out in the second quarter, followed by a 55-yarder on the initial possession of the second half. McCoy was placed in concussion protocol after the third play from scrimmage of the second half, and was replaced by third-string quarterback Trace McSorley. Trailing 9–3, Broncos' backup quarterback Brett Rypien, starting in place of Russell Wilson, led a 7-play, 80-yard drive, culminating in a 3-yard touchdown run by running back Marlon Mack midway through the third quarter, which gave the Broncos the lead for good. Wilson was cleared from concussion protocol two days earlier, but did not play. Despite an interception of Rypien deep in Cardinals' territory at the end of the third quarter, the Broncos later added two more touchdowns in the fourth quarter—a 10-yard run by running back Latavius Murray, followed by a 3-yard pass from Rypien to tight end Eric Tomlinson. The Cardinals finally reached the end zone on their next possession, with running back James Conner rushing for a 1-yard touchdown to narrow the Broncos' lead to 24–15. However, the Cardinals went for an unsuccessful two-point conversion, instead of going for the extra point that would have pulled them to within a one-score deficit. The Broncos then proceeded to run out the clock.

Notes

The Broncos improved their all-time series record against the Cardinals to 10–1–1, including 6–0 in Denver.

==== Week 16: at Los Angeles Rams ====
Christmas Day games

Week 16: Denver Broncos at Los Angeles Rams – Game summary

Quarter	1	2	3	4	Total
Broncos	3	3	0	8	**14**
**Rams**	17	14	3	17	**51**

at SoFi Stadium, Inglewood, California

- Date: December 25
- Game time: 2:30 p.m. MST/1:30 p.m. PST
- Game weather: Sunny, 82 °F (28 °C)
- Game attendance: 71,525
- Referee: Ronald Torbert
- TV announcers (CBS/Nick): Jim Nantz, Tony Romo and Tracy Wolfson (CBS)
  Noah Eagle, Nate Burleson, Gabrielle Nevaeh Green, Dylan Schefter, Mia Burleson and Bill Fagerbakke (as Patrick Star) (Nickelodeon)
- Recap, Game Book

Game information

**First quarter**

- LAR – Matt Gay 55-yard field goal, 8:26. Rams 3–0. **Drive: 11 plays, 38 yards, 6:34.**
- LAR – Tyler Higbee 9-yard pass from Baker Mayfield (Matt Gay kick), 6:19. Rams 10–0. **Drive: 3 plays, 34 yards, 1:16.**
- LAR – Cam Akers 2-yard run (Matt Gay kick), 4:45. Rams 17–0. **Drive: 2 plays, 11 yards, 0:27.**
- DEN – Brandon McManus 54-yard field goal, 0:39. Rams 17–3. **Drive: 8 plays, 39 yards, 4:06.**

**Second quarter**

- LAR – Tyler Higbee 7-yard pass from Baker Mayfield (Matt Gay kick), 9:42. Rams 24–3. **Drive: 11 plays, 75 yards, 5:57.**
- LAR – Cam Akers 2-yard run (Matt Gay kick), 1:06. Rams 31–3. **Drive: 12 plays, 90 yards, 6:06.**
- DEN – Brandon McManus 49-yard field goal, 0:00. Rams 31–6. **Drive: 7 plays, 44 yards, 1:06.**

**Third quarter**

- LAR – Matt Gay 30-yard field goal, 3:49. Rams 34–6. **Drive: 15 plays, 68 yards, 9:08.**

**Fourth quarter**

- LAR – Cam Akers 4-yard run (Matt Gay kick), 12:31. Rams 41–6. **Drive: 8 plays, 60 yards, 4:47.**
- DEN – Greg Dulcich 11-yard pass from Russell Wilson (Latavius Murray run), 8:30. Rams 41–14. **Drive: 12 plays, 75 yards, 4:01.**
- LAR – Matt Gay 53-yard field goal, 6:16. Rams 44–14. **Drive: 4 plays, 6 yards, 2:14.**
- LAR – Cobie Durant 85-yard interception return (Matt Gay kick), 4:08. Rams 51–14.

**Top passers**

- DEN – Russell Wilson – 15/27, 214 yards, TD, 3 INT
- LAR – Baker Mayfield – 24/28, 230 yards, 2 TD

**Top rushers**

- DEN – Latavius Murray – 8 rushes, 34 yards
- LAR – Cam Akers – 23 rushes, 118 yards, 3 TD

**Top receivers**

- DEN – Jerry Jeudy – 6 receptions, 117 yards
- LAR – Tyler Higbee – 9 receptions, 94 yards, 2 TD

On Christmas Day, the Broncos traveled to Los Angeles to take on the Rams, who they have not defeated since 2002, when the franchise was based in St. Louis. The Broncos' defense, which was one of their few highs throughout the season, displayed their poorest performance, and failed to force a punt or turnover off the Rams, in a 51–14 loss. The Rams jumped out to a 17–0 lead in the first quarter, and the Broncos never recovered, with the Rams taking advantage of two early interceptions by Broncos' quarterback Russell Wilson. Rams' quarterback Baker Mayfield threw two touchdown passes—both to tight end Tyler Higbee, running back Cam Akers rushed for three touchdowns, and cornerback Cobie Durant returned an interception off backup quarterback Brett Rypien 85 yards for a touchdown late in the game. Offensively, the Broncos did not reach the end zone, until midway through the fourth quarter, when Wilson connected on an 11-yard touchdown pass to tight end Greg Dulcich, by which time the game had already been decided in the Rams' favor. The Broncos' surrendered 50+ points for the first time since a 51–23 loss to the Philadelphia Eagles during Week 9 of the 2017 season. The loss also secured the Broncos their third consecutive fourth place finish in the AFC West, marking the first time that the Broncos finished last in their division in 3+ seasons since 1963–1971. The next day, head coach Nathaniel Hackett was dismissed.

==== Week 17: at Kansas City Chiefs ====
Week 17: Denver Broncos at Kansas City Chiefs – Game summary

Quarter	1	2	3	4	Total
Broncos	0	10	7	7	**24**
**Chiefs**	6	7	0	14	**27**

at Arrowhead Stadium, Kansas City, Missouri

- Date: January 1, 2023
- Game time: 12:00 p.m. CST/11:00 a.m. MST
- Game weather: 53 °F (12 °C)
- Game attendance: 73,571
- Referee: Tra Blake
- TV announcers (CBS): Greg Gumbel, Adam Archuleta and AJ Ross
- Recap, Game Book

Game information

**First quarter**

- KC – Isiah Pacheco 5-yard run (run failed), 7:35. Chiefs 6–0. **Drive: 10 plays, 65 yards, 5:42.**

**Second quarter**

- DEN – Brandon McManus 49-yard field goal, 10:46. Chiefs 6–3. **Drive: 14 plays, 49 yards, 6:46.**
- DEN – Russell Wilson 16-yard run (Brandon McManus kick), 4:40. Broncos 10–6. **Drive: 1 plays, 16 yards, 0:05.**
- KC – Jerick McKinnon 6-yard pass from Patrick Mahomes (Harrison Butker kick), 1:02. Chiefs 13–10. **Drive: 7 plays, 75 yards, 3:38.**

**Third quarter**

- DEN – Albert Okwuegbunam 25-yard pass from Russell Wilson (Brandon McManus kick), 6:35. Broncos 17–13. **Drive: 6 plays, 63 yards, 3:48.**

**Fourth quarter**

- KC – Blake Bell 17-yard pass from Patrick Mahomes (Harrison Butker kick), 14:50. Chiefs 20–17. **Drive: 6 plays, 65 yards, 3:06.**
- KC – Jerick McKinnon 3-yard pass from Patrick Mahomes (Harrison Butker kick), 12:36. Chiefs 27–17. **Drive: 4 plays, 17 yards, 1:55.**
- DEN – Russell Wilson 4-yard run (Brandon McManus kick), 6:14. Chiefs 27–24. **Drive: 12 plays, 75 yards, 6:22.**

**Top passers**

- DEN – Russell Wilson – 26/38, 222 yards, TD, INT
- KC – Patrick Mahomes – 29/42, 328 yards, 3 TD, INT

**Top rushers**

- DEN – Latavius Murray – 12 rushes, 56 yards
- KC – Isiah Pacheco – 9 rushes, 31 yards, TD

**Top receivers**

- DEN – Albert Okwuegbunam – 3 receptions, 45 yards, TD
- KC – Kadarius Toney – 4 receptions, 71 yards

The Chiefs took an early lead over the Broncos, with running back Isiah Pacheco rushing for a 5-yard touchdown, coupled with a botched snap on the extra point attempt. The Broncos then took a 10–6 lead, with a 49-yard field goal by placekicker Brandon McManus, followed by quarterback Russell Wilson scrambling for a 16-yard touchdown run. The Chiefs retook the lead just before halftime, with quarterback Patrick Mahomes connecting on a 3-yard touchdown pass to running back Jerick McKinnon just before halftime. The Broncos took a 17–13 lead midway through the third quarter, with Wilson throwing a 25-yard touchdown pass to tight end Albert Okwuegbunam. After forcing a three-and-out, the Broncos were trying to add to their lead; however, a costly pass interference penalty negated a 44-yard pass completion from Wilson to wide receiver Courtland Sutton, forcing the Broncos to punt. The Chiefs went back on top on the first play of the fourth quarter, with Mahomes' second touchdown pass of the game—a 17-yarder to tight end Blake Bell. Following a Wilson interception on the next Broncos' first play from scrimmage, the Chiefs increased their lead to 27–17, with a 3-yard touchdown pass from Mahomes to McKinnon. The Broncos drove down the field, and Wilson ran for a 4-yard touchdown to narrow the Chiefs' lead to 27–24, on a drive that took over six minutes off the clock. The drive was aided by a defensive illegal use of hands penalty on Chiefs' cornerback Joshua Williams that negated an interception of Wilson on a 4th-and-7. After forcing a Chiefs' punt, the Broncos had one last possession with 3:53 remaining in the game. After earning one first down, the Broncos faced a 4th-and-2 from their own 45-yard line with 1:21 remaining; however, Wilson was sacked to end the Broncos' rally attempt. The Broncos' 15th consecutive loss to the Chiefs became the longest losing streak against one opponent in team history, surpassing a 14-game winless skid against the Oakland Raiders from 1965–1971.

==== Week 18: vs. Los Angeles Chargers ====
Week 18: Los Angeles Chargers at Denver Broncos – Game summary

Quarter	1	2	3	4	Total
Chargers	7	10	3	8	**28**
**Broncos**	7	10	7	7	**31**

at Empower Field at Mile High, Denver, Colorado

- Date: January 8
- Game time: 2:25 p.m. MST
- Game weather: Partly cloudy, 51 °F (11 °C)
- Game attendance: 60,833
- Referee: Shawn Hochuli
- TV announcers (CBS): Andrew Catalon and James Lofton
- Recap, Game Book

Game information

**First quarter**

- LAC – Keenan Allen 14-yard pass from Justin Herbert (Cameron Dicker kick), 11:17. Chargers 7–0. **Drive: 8 plays, 75 yards, 3:43.**
- DEN – Latavius Murray 2-yard run (Brandon McManus kick), 3:55. Tied 7–7. **Drive: 13 plays, 75 yards, 7:22.**

**Second quarter**

- LAC – Gerald Everett 3-yard pass from Justin Herbert (Cameron Dicker kick), 10:57. Chargers 14–7. **Drive: 12 plays, 53 yards, 5:40.**
- DEN – Brandon McManus 33-yard field goal, 2:43. Chargers 14–10. **Drive: 7 plays, 34 yards, 3:29.**
- LAC – Cameron Dicker 48-yard field goal, 0:26. Chargers 17–10. **Drive: 6 plays, 33 yards, 0:42.**
- DEN – Eric Tomlinson 3-yard pass from Russell Wilson (Brandon McManus kick), 0:06. Tied 17–17. **Drive: 3 plays, 75 yards, 0:20.**

**Third quarter**

- DEN – Tyler Badie 24-yard pass from Russell Wilson (Brandon McManus kick), 11:42. Broncos 24–17. **Drive: 6 plays, 75 yards, 3:18.**
- LAC – Cameron Dicker 36-yard field goal, 6:42. Broncos 24–20. **Drive: 5 plays, 28 yards, 2:08.**

**Fourth quarter**

- DEN – Courtland Sutton 20-yard pass from Russell Wilson (Brandon McManus kick), 11:15. Broncos 31–20. **Drive: 8 plays, 89 yards, 4:06.**
- LAC – Keenan Allen 3-yard pass from Chase Daniel (Cameron Dicker–Josh Palmer pass), 6:02. Broncos 31–28. **Drive: 6 plays, 29 yards, 3:03.**

**Top passers**

- LAC – Justin Herbert – 25/37, 273 yards, 2 TD
- DEN – Russell Wilson – 13/24, 283 yards, 3 TD, INT

**Top rushers**

- LAC – Austin Ekeler – 11 rushes, 34 yards
- DEN – Latavius Murray – 15 rushes, 103 yards, TD

**Top receivers**

- LAC – Keenan Allen – 8 receptions, 102 yards, 2 TD
- DEN – Jerry Jeudy – 5 receptions, 154 yards

In their finale of what was a difficult 2022 season, the Broncos achieved their highest scoring output against the Chargers, in their only game with 30+ points. After a 17–17 tie at halftime, the Broncos took the lead for good early in the third quarter, with quarterback Russell Wilson throwing a 24-yard touchdown pass to running back Tyler Badie. Wilson threw another touchdown pass to tight end Eric Tomlinson just before halftime, and running back Latavius Murray rushed for another. Defensively, the Broncos surrendered two touchdown passes to Chargers' quarterback Justin Herbert—both in the first half, and after building a 31–20 lead, yielded another to backup quarterback Chase Daniel (plus a successful two-point conversion) to narrow the Broncos' lead to 31–28 at the 6-minute mark of the fourth quarter. The Chargers attempted a rally, but turned the football over on downs on their next possession, and the Broncos ran out the clock. With the win, the Broncos avoided a winless division record and avoided setting a new franchise record for most losses in a season.

=== Standings ===
==== Division ====
AFC West
	W	L	T	PCT	DIV	CONF	PF	PA	STK
^{(1)} Kansas City Chiefs	14	3	0	.824	6–0	9–3	496	369	W5
^{(5)} Los Angeles Chargers	10	7	0	.588	2–4	7–5	391	384	L1
Las Vegas Raiders	6	11	0	.353	3–3	5–7	395	418	L3
Denver Broncos	5	12	0	.294	1–5	3–9	287	359	W1

==== Conference ====
AFC
#	Team	Division	W	L	T	PCT	DIV	CONF	SOS	SOV	STK
**Division leaders**
1	Kansas City Chiefs	West	14	3	0	.824	6–0	9–3	.453	.422	W5
2	Buffalo Bills	East	13	3	0	.813	4–2	9–2	.489	.471	W7
3	Cincinnati Bengals	North	12	4	0	.750	3–3	8–3	.507	.490	W8
4	Jacksonville Jaguars	South	9	8	0	.529	4–2	8–4	.467	.438	W5
**Wild cards**
5 (Note: LA Chargers claimed the No. 5 seed over Baltimore based on conference record (7–5 vs. 6–6).)	Los Angeles Chargers	West	10	7	0	.588	2–4	7–5	.443	.341	L1
6	Baltimore Ravens	North	10	7	0	.588	3–3	6–6	.509	.456	L2
7 (Note: Miami finished ahead of Pittsburgh based on head-to-head victory, claiming the 7th and final playoff spot.)	Miami Dolphins	East	9	8	0	.529	3–3	7–5	.537	.457	W1
**Did not qualify for the postseason**
8	Pittsburgh Steelers	North	9	8	0	.529	3–3	5–7	.519	.451	W4
9	New England Patriots	East	8	9	0	.471	3–3	6–6	.502	.415	L1
10 (Note: NY Jets and Tennessee finished ahead of Cleveland based on conference record (5–7 vs. 4–8).) (Note: NY Jets finished ahead of Tennessee based on common record (3–3 vs. 2–4 against: Buffalo, Cincinnati, Denver, Green Bay, Jacksonville).)	New York Jets	East	7	10	0	.412	2–4	5–7	.538	.458	L6
11	Tennessee Titans	South	7	10	0	.412	3–3	5–7	.509	.336	L7
12	Cleveland Browns	North	7	10	0	.412	3–3	4–8	.524	.492	L1
13	Las Vegas Raiders	West	6	11	0	.353	3–3	5–7	.474	.397	L3
14	Denver Broncos	West	5	12	0	.294	1–5	3–9	.481	.465	W1
15	Indianapolis Colts	South	4	12	1	.265	1–4–1	4–7–1	.512	.500	L7
16	Houston Texans	South	3	13	1	.206	3–2–1	3–8–1	.481	.402	W1
**Tiebreakers** (Note: When breaking ties for three or more teams under the NFL's rules, they are first broken within divisions, then comparing only the highest ranked remaining team from each division.)

=== Statistics ===
==== Team leaders ====
Category	Player(s)	Value
Passing yards	Russell Wilson	3,524
Passing touchdowns	Russell Wilson	16
Rushing yards	Latavius Murray	703
Rushing touchdowns	Latavius Murray	5
Receptions	Jerry Jeudy	67
Receiving yards	Jerry Jeudy	972
Receiving touchdowns	Jerry Jeudy	6
Points	Brandon McManus	109
Kickoff return yards	Montrell Washington	340
Punt return yards	Montrell Washington	271
Tackles	Alex Singleton	163
Sacks	Dre'Mont Jones	6.5
Forced fumbles	Justin Simmons	3
Interceptions	Justin Simmons	6

Source for this section: Denver Broncos' official website.

==== League rankings ====
Offense
Category	Value	NFL rank (out of 32)
Total yards	325.1 YPG	21st
Yards per play	5.1	T–23rd
Rushing yards	113.8 YPG	21st
Yards per rush	4.4	T–16th
Passing yards	211.3 YPG	19th
Yards per pass	7.0	T–16th
Pass completions	345/571 (.604)	29th
Total touchdowns	29	T–28th
Rushing touchdowns	11	28th
Receiving touchdowns	18	23rd
Scoring	16.9 PPG	32nd
Red Zone Touchdowns	20/36 (.556)	16th
Third down efficiency	67/230 (.291)	32nd
Fourth down efficiency	12/24 (.500)	T–18th
First downs per game	17.6	25th
Fewest sacks allowed	63	32nd
Fewest giveaways	24	26th
Fewest penalties	113	T–30th
Least penalty yardage	970	32nd

Defense
Category	Value	NFL rank (out of 32)
Total yards	320.0 YPG	7th
Yards per play	5.0	T–3rd
Rushing yards	109.8 YPG	10th
Yards per rush	4.3	T–11th
Passing yards	210.2 YPG	12th
Yards per pass	6.3	T–1st
Pass completions	392/605 (.648)	18th
Total touchdowns	35	T–6th
Rushing touchdowns	12	T–10th
Receiving touchdowns	20	T–5th
Scoring	21.1 PPG	T–13th
Red Zone Touchdowns	24/47 (.511)	7th
Third down efficiency	75/220 (.341)	2nd
Fourth down efficiency	9/14 (.643)	29th
First downs per game	19.1	T–12th
Sacks	36	T–23rd
Takeaways	23	T–14th
Fewest penalties	106	29th
Least penalty yardage	922	31st

Special teams
Category	Value	NFL rank (out of 32)
Gross punting	46.6 YPP	17th
Net punting	41.4 YPP	T–11th
Kickoffs	62.7 YPK	13th
Punt returns	8.3 YPR	T–20th
Kick returns	17.5 YPR	32nd
Punt coverage	8.2 YPR	13th
Kick coverage	21.2 YPR	T–8th

Source for this section: Pro-Football Reference.

=== Starters ===
Position	Player	Age	Years pro	Starts
Offense
QB	Russell Wilson	34	10	15
RB	Latavius Murray	32	8	7
WR	Courtland Sutton	27	4	15
WR	Jerry Jeudy	23	2	14
TE	Eric Tomlinson	30	6	12
TE	Eric Saubert	28	5	6
LT	Cameron Fleming	30	8	15
LG	Dalton Risner	27	3	15
C	Graham Glasgow	30	6	13
RG	Quinn Meinerz	24	1	13
RT	Billy Turner	31	8	7
Defense
LDE	Dre'Mont Jones	25	3	13
NT	D. J. Jones	27	5	15
RDE	DeShawn Williams	30	6	15
LOLB	Jonathon Cooper	24	1	9
LILB	Josey Jewell	28	4	13
RILB	Alex Singleton	29	3	12
ROLB	Baron Browning	23	1	8
LCB	Patrick Surtain II	22	1	17
SS	Kareem Jackson	34	12	17
FS	Justin Simmons	29	6	12
RCB	Damarri Mathis	23	Rookie	11

Source for this section: Pro-Football Reference.

== Awards and honors ==
Recipient	Award(s)
Corliss Waitman	Week 3: AFC Special Teams Player of the Week
Dre'Mont Jones	Week 8: AFC Defensive Player of the Week
Jerry Jeudy	Week 18: AFC Offensive Player of the Week

=== Pro Bowl and All-Pro selections ===
On December 21, cornerback Patrick Surtain II was named a starter for the 2023 Pro Bowl Games. He is the Broncos' lone representative. Surtain was later named as a first-team All-Pro in the NFL's inaugural All-Pro team on January 11, 2023, and two days later (January 13), safety Justin Simmons was named as a second-team All-Pro.
