= Mitchell Fraboni =

American football player (born 1998)

No. 48 – Denver Broncos
- Position: Long snapper
- Roster status: Active

Personal information
- Born: October 28, 1996 (age 30); Phoenix, Arizona, U.S.
- Listed height: 6 ft 2 in (1.88 m)
- Listed weight: 223 lb (101 kg)

Career information
- High school: Mountain Pointe (Phoenix)
- College: Arizona State (2014–2017)
- NFL draft: 2018: undrafted

Career history
- Houston Texans (2021)*; Pittsburgh Maulers (2022); Denver Broncos (2022–present)
- * Offseason or practice squad member only

Career NFL statistics as of Week 8, 2026
- Games played: 63
- Tackles: 21
- Forced fumbles: 1
- Stats at Pro Football Reference

Mitchell Fraboni (born October 28, 1996) is an American professional football long snapper for the Denver Broncos of the National Football League (NFL). He played college football for the Arizona State Sun Devils and he was signed as an undrafted free agent by the Houston Texans in 2018.

== Early life and education ==
=== High school ===
Fraboni attended Mountain Pointe High School where he played football. He played multiple positions including tight end, defensive end, and long snapper. He helped Mountain Pointe win their first ever Arizona State Football championship. He finished with 49 solo tackles, 10 sacks and 68 total tackles during high school.

=== College career ===
Fraboni was a long snapper and defensive end for the Sun Devils from 2014 to 2017. He had 13 total tackles and one fumble recovery in 4 seasons as a defensive end. He tied for the most special team tackles on the Sun Devils in his sophomore season at ASU. He was injured in his junior season, but came back and showed he was one of the most accurate/athletic long snappers in the PAC-12. In his senior season he was named to Phil Steele's all Pac-12 team and was one of ten Sun Devils to earn All Pac-12 Academic Honors.

Fraboni, kicker Zane Gonzalez, and punter Matt Haack formed one of the best special teams units in college football at the time. He was praised for being a good locker room presence by special teams coach Shawn Slocum. As a senior, he was a key component in helping the Sun Devils special teams flourish after Gonzales and Haack left for the NFL. Slocum also said that he was half player, half coach for the younger players.

==== College statistics ====
Year	Team	GP	Tackles					Fumbles			
Year	Team	GP	Solo	Ast	Tot	Loss	Sk	FR	Yds	TD	FF
2014	Arizona State	4	3	0	3	0.0	0.0	1	0	0	0
2015	Arizona State	4	2	3	5	0.0	0.0	0	0	0	0
2016	Arizona State	3	2	1	3	0.0	0.0	0	0	0	0
2017	Arizona State	2	1	1	2	0.0	0.0	0	0	0	0
Career		13	8	5	13	0.0	0.0	1	0	0	0

== Professional career ==
Pre-draft measurables
Height	Weight	Arm length	Hand span	Wingspan	40-yard dash	10-yard split	20-yard split	20-yard shuttle	Three-cone drill	Vertical jump	Broad jump	Bench press
6 ft 1 3/4 in (1.87 m)	238 lb (108 kg)	31 1/4 in (0.79 m)	9 5/8 in (0.24 m)	6 ft 4 1/2 in (1.94 m)	4.85 s	1.72 s	2.82 s	4.53 s	7.45 s	29.5 in (0.75 m)	8 ft 9 in (2.67 m)	24 reps
All values from Pro Day

After going undrafted in the 2018 NFL draft, Fraboni participated in the Houston Texans' mini camp in 2018 and the Arizona Cardinals' mini camp in 2019, but remained unsigned by any NFL team.

=== Houston Texans ===
During the 2021 NFL offseason, Fraboni was signed by the Houston Texans, but was cut from the roster soon after.

=== Pittsburgh Maulers ===
Fraboni was selected in the 35th round of the 2022 USFL draft by the Pittsburgh Maulers, playing with them during the 2022 season.

=== Denver Broncos ===
On October 11, 2022, Fraboni was signed to the Denver Broncos' practice squad. He was promoted to the active roster on October 24. After fracturing his finger, Fraboni was placed on injured reserve on November 17. He was replaced by Jacob Bobenmoyer, who had just recovered from his own IR stint.

On March 11, 2025, Fraboni signed a three-year, $4.175 million extension with the Broncos.

On August 30, 2026, Fraboni was released by the Broncos as a part of final roster cuts; he was re–signed to the team's practice squad the next day. He was elevated to the active roster for Week 1 and Week 2. On September 26, Fraboni was promoted to the active roster.

== NFL career statistics ==
Legend
**Bold**	Career high

=== Regular season ===
Year	Team	Games		Tackles					Interceptions						Fumbles				
Year	Team	GP	GS	Cmb	Solo	Ast	Sck	TFL	Int	Yds	Avg	Lng	TD	PD	FF	Fum	FR	Yds	TD
2022	DEN	4	0	5	**3**	2	0.0	0	0	0	0.0	0	0	0	0	0	0	0	0
2023	DEN	17	0	**6**	2	**4**	0.0	0	0	0	0.0	0	0	0	**1**	0	0	0	0
2024	DEN	17	0	5	**3**	2	0.0	0	0	0	0.0	0	0	0	0	0	0	0	0
2025	DEN	17	0	4	**3**	1	0.0	0	0	0	0.0	0	0	0	0	0	0	0	0
Career		55	0	20	11	9	0.0	0	0	0	0.0	0	0	0	1	0	0	0	0

=== Postseason ===
Year	Team	Games		Tackles					Interceptions						Fumbles				
Year	Team	GP	GS	Cmb	Solo	Ast	Sck	TFL	Int	Yds	Avg	Lng	TD	PD	FF	Fum	FR	Yds	TD
2024	DEN	1	0	0	0	0	0.0	0	0	0	0.0	0	0	0	0	0	0	0	0
2025	DEN	2	0	0	0	0	0.0	0	0	0	0.0	0	0	0	0	0	0	0	0
Career		3	0	0	0	0	0.0	0	0	0	0.0	0	0	0	0	0	0	0	0
