= DeShawn Williams =

American football player (born 1992)

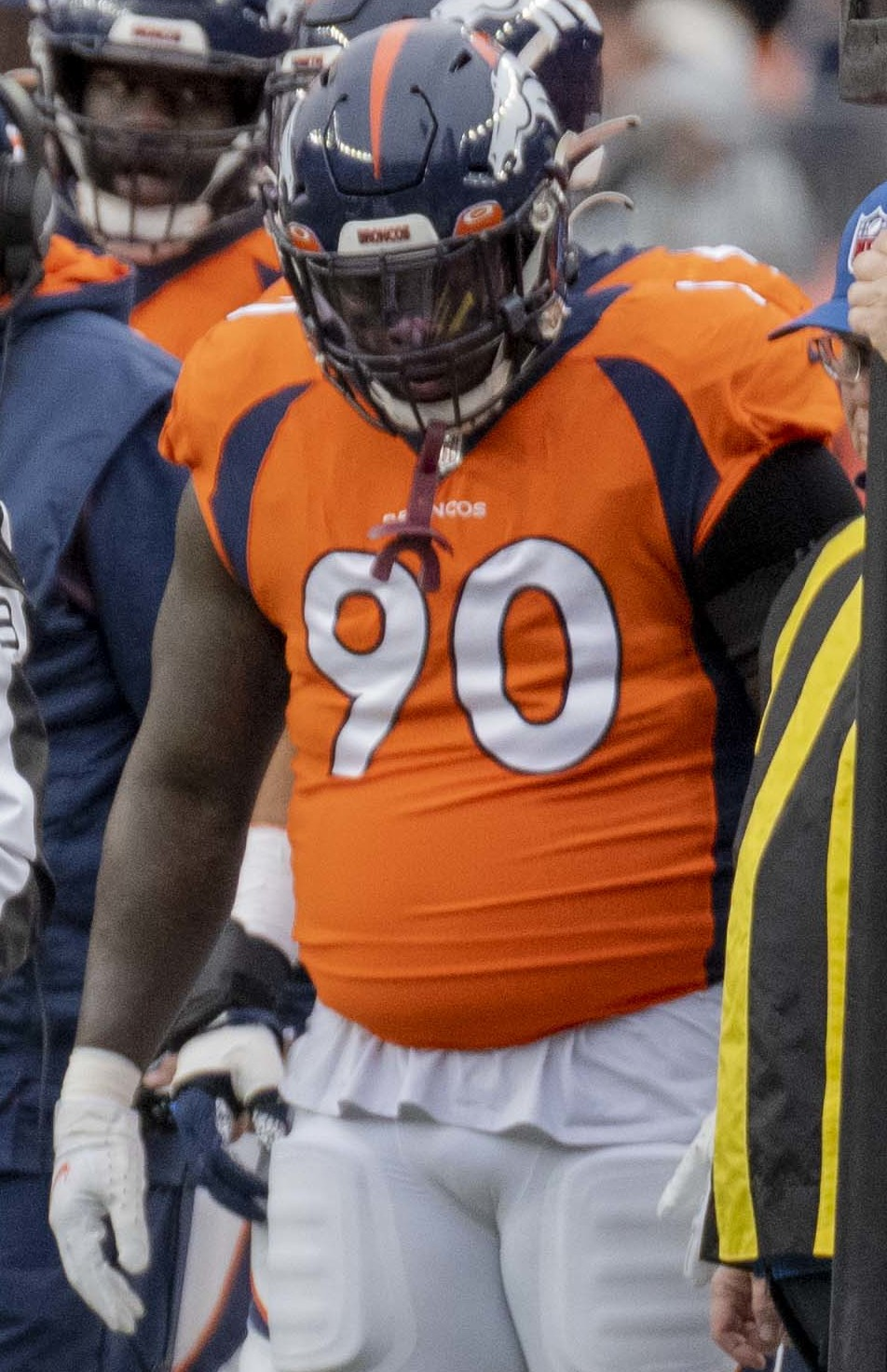
- Williams with the Denver Broncos in 2021

Profile
- Position: Defensive tackle

Personal information
- Born: December 29, 1992 (age 33); Central, South Carolina, U.S.
- Listed height: 6 ft 1 in (1.85 m)
- Listed weight: 295 lb (134 kg)

Career information
- High school: D. W. Daniel (Central)
- College: Clemson (2011–2014)
- NFL draft: 2015: undrafted

Career history
- Cincinnati Bengals (2015–2017); Denver Broncos (2018)*; Miami Dolphins (2018)*; Indianapolis Colts (2018)*; Denver Broncos (2019)*; Calgary Stampeders (2020)*; Denver Broncos (2020–2022); Carolina Panthers (2023); Buffalo Bills (2024)*; Carolina Panthers (2024)
- * Offseason or practice squad member only

Career NFL statistics as of 2024
- Total tackles: 164
- Sacks: 9.5
- Interceptions: 1
- Stats at Pro Football Reference

DeShawn Shamaine Williams (born December 29, 1992) is an American professional football defensive end. He played college football for the Clemson Tigers.

== Professional career ==
Pre-draft measurables
Height	Weight	Arm length	Hand span	40-yard dash	10-yard split	20-yard split	20-yard shuttle	Three-cone drill	Vertical jump	Broad jump	Bench press
6 ft 0 1/2 in (1.84 m)	303 lb (137 kg)	32 1/4 in (0.82 m)	9 1/4 in (0.23 m)	5.07 s	1.71 s	2.94 s	4.66 s	7.70 s	30.0 in (0.76 m)	8 ft 9 in (2.67 m)	28 reps
All values from Pro Day

=== Cincinnati Bengals ===
Williams signed with the Cincinnati Bengals as an undrafted free agent on May 8, 2015. He was released by the Bengals on September 5, 2015, during final roster cuts and was signed to the practice squad the next day. He spent his entire rookie season on the practice squad. He signed a reserve/futures contract with the Bengals on January 6, 2016.

He was released by the Bengals on November 26, 2016, but was re-signed two days later.

On September 2, 2017, Williams was waived by the Bengals and was signed to the practice squad the next day.

=== Denver Broncos (first stint) ===
On January 17, 2018, Williams signed a reserve/future contract with the Denver Broncos. He was waived on September 1, 2018, and was signed to the practice squad the next day. He was released on September 11, 2018.

=== Miami Dolphins ===
On October 16, 2018, Williams was signed to the Miami Dolphins practice squad. On December 5, 2018, Williams was released from the Dolphins practice squad.

=== Indianapolis Colts ===
On December 10, 2018, Williams was signed to the Indianapolis Colts practice squad. He signed a reserve/future contract on January 13, 2019. He was waived on April 30, 2019.

=== Denver Broncos (second stint) ===
On May 13, 2019, Williams was signed by the Broncos. He was released on August 31, 2019.

=== Calgary Stampeders ===
Williams signed with the Calgary Stampeders of the Canadian Football League (CFL) on December 5, 2019. He was released on August 11, 2020. He did not play a game for the Stampeders as the 2020 CFL season had been postponed to due the COVID-19 pandemic in Canada.

=== Denver Broncos (third stint) ===
On August 15, 2020, Williams re-signed with the Broncos, his third stint with the team. He was waived on September 5, 2020, but was signed to the practice squad the following day. He was promoted to the active roster on September 25, 2020.

In Week 6 against the New England Patriots, Williams recorded his first career interception off a pass thrown by Cam Newton during the 18–12 win. In Week 11 against the Miami Dolphins, Williams recorded his first two career sacks on Tua Tagovailoa during the 20–13 win.

Williams entered the 2021 season as a backup interior defensive lineman. He was named a starter in Week 8 and started the remainder of the season. He suffered an elbow injury in Week 16 and was placed on injured reserve on December 28. He finished the season with 39 tackles, one sack, and two passes defensed through 15 games and eight starts.

On March 18, 2022, Williams re-signed with the Broncos. He played all 17 games with 15 starts, recording 37 tackles and a career-high 4.5 sacks.

=== Carolina Panthers ===
On March 15, 2023, Williams signed a one-year contract with the Carolina Panthers. He played in 16 games with 10 starts, recording 33 tackles and one sack.

=== Buffalo Bills ===
On March 28, 2024, Williams signed with the Buffalo Bills. He was released as part of final roster cuts on August 27.

=== Carolina Panthers (second stint) ===
On September 10, 2024, Williams was signed to the Carolina Panthers practice squad. He was promoted to the active roster on October 8. He was waived on December 10, and re-signed to the practice squad the next day.

== NFL career statistics ==
Legend
**Bold**	Career high

Year	Team	Games		Tackles					Interceptions					Fumbles			
Year	Team	GP	GS	Cmb	Solo	Ast	Sck	TFL	Int	Yds	TD	Lng	PD	FF	FR	Yds	TD
2016	CIN	4	0	2	1	1	0.5	0	0	0	0	0	0	0	0	0	0
2020	DEN	14	11	37	20	17	2.0	**4**	**1**	**1**	0	**1**	**3**	0	0	0	0
2021	DEN	15	8	**39**	17	**22**	1.0	1	0	0	0	0	2	0	0	0	0
2022	DEN	**17**	**15**	37	**21**	16	**4.5**	**4**	0	0	0	0	**3**	0	0	0	0
2023	CAR	16	10	33	13	20	1.0	2	0	0	0	0	1	0	0	0	0
Total		66	44	148	72	76	9.0	11	1	1	0	1	9	0	0	0	0
