= D. J. Jones (defensive lineman) =

American football player (born 1995)

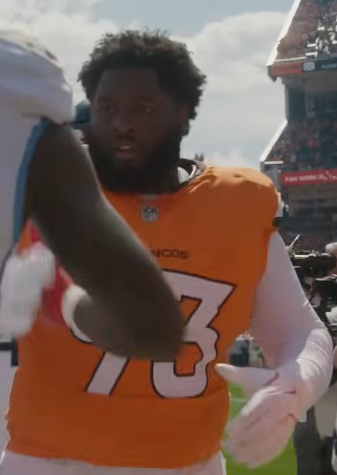
- Jones with the Denver Broncos in 2025

No. 93 – Denver Broncos
- Position: Nose tackle
- Roster status: Active

Personal information
- Born: January 19, 1995 (age 31); Greenville, South Carolina, U.S.
- Listed height: 6 ft 0 in (1.83 m)
- Listed weight: 305 lb (138 kg)

Career information
- High school: Wren (Piedmont, South Carolina)
- College: East Mississippi CC (2013–2014); Ole Miss (2015–2016)
- NFL draft: 2017: 6th round, 198th overall pick

Career history
- San Francisco 49ers (2017–2021); Denver Broncos (2022–present)

Career NFL statistics as of 2025
- Tackles: 287
- Sacks: 15
- Forced fumbles: 6
- Fumble recoveries: 3
- Pass deflections: 13
- Stats at Pro Football Reference

David Oliver "D. J." Jones (born January 19, 1995) is an American professional football nose tackle for the Denver Broncos of the National Football League (NFL). He played college football for the Ole Miss Rebels. Jones was selected by the San Francisco 49ers in the sixth round of the 2017 NFL draft.

== College career ==
After impressive years throughout high school, Jones was heavily recruited for football by colleges throughout the U.S.

Jones began his college career at the East Mississippi Community College in Scooba, Mississippi, the school that was featured in the 2016 Netflix documentary "Last Chance U". As a two-year starter during his two seasons, Jones helped guide East Mississippi to a perfect 24–0 record and two NJCAA national championships. In 2013, as a freshman, he played in 12 games and registered 49 tackles, 8.0 sacks, 5.0 tackles-for-loss and 1 forced fumble. As a sophomore, he earned MACJC all-region and all-state honors and recorded 29 tackles, 4.0 sacks, 8.5 tackles-for-loss, and 2 forced fumbles in 12 games. Prior to transferring, Jones was listed as the No. 3 junior college prospect in the country by 247sports.com and ESPN.com.

He transferred to the University of Mississippi for the 2015 season. After transferring, Jones immediately became one of the strongest Rebels. According to NFL.com, he benched 440 pounds, squatted 650 pounds and had a max clean of 330 pounds when he finished his time at East Mississippi Community College.

In two seasons at Ole Miss, Jones played in 25 games, with 15 starts, and registered 70 tackles, 6.0 sacks, 8.5 tackles-for-loss, 1 interception, 1 forced fumble, 1 fumble recovery, and 1 pass deflection. In 2016, as a senior, he started all 12 games and tallied 30 tackles, 2.0 sacks, 3.0 tackles-for-loss, 1 interception, and 1 fumble recovery. As a junior, he played in 13 games, starting three of them, and notched 40 tackles, 4.0 sacks, 5.5 tackles-for-loss, and 1 forced fumble.

== Professional career ==
Pre-draft measurables
Height	Weight	Arm length	Hand span	Wingspan	40-yard dash	10-yard split	20-yard split	20-yard shuttle	Three-cone drill	Vertical jump	Broad jump	Bench press
6 ft 0 5/8 in (1.84 m)	319 lb (145 kg)	32 1/2 in (0.83 m)	10 1/4 in (0.26 m)	6 ft 5 1/2 in (1.97 m)	5.04 s	1.76 s	2.90 s	4.65 s	7.73 s	28.5 in (0.72 m)	9 ft 0 in (2.74 m)	28 reps
All values from 2017 NFL Combine/Pro Day

=== San Francisco 49ers ===
Jones was drafted by the San Francisco 49ers in the sixth round, 198th overall, in the 2017 NFL draft. Jones was a big part of the Niners defensive line rotation and a stalwart against the run. He improved from his rookie to his sophomore year, with the analytic website Pro Football Focus noting his grade against the run improved from 57.5 as a rookie to 63.9 in 2018. He was in on 13 percent of defensive snaps in 2017 and 22 percent in 2018. On October 27, 2019, Jones got his first career sack on Kyle Allen of the Carolina Panthers.

In 2019, Jones started 11 games before suffering a high ankle sprain in Week 14. He was placed on injured reserve on December 14, 2019.

Jones was placed on the reserve/COVID-19 list by the team on November 23, 2020, and activated on December 2.

Jones re-signed with the 49ers on a one-year contract on March 22, 2021.

=== Denver Broncos ===
Jones with the Broncos in 2026

On March 17, 2022, Jones signed a three-year, $30 million contract with the Denver Broncos. Jones served as the primary defensive tackle and nose tackle in their 3–4 defensive scheme, starting 48 games and logging 122 tackles, eleven quarterback hits, nine tackles-for-loss, nine pass deflections, five sacks, three forced fumbles, and three fumble recoveries over the course of three seasons.

On March 11, 2025, Jones signed a three-year, $39 million extension with the Broncos.

== NFL career statistics ==
Legend
**Bold**	Career high

=== Regular season ===
Year	Team	Games		Tackles					Interceptions						Fumbles				
Year	Team	GP	GS	Cmb	Solo	Ast	Sck	TFL	Int	Yds	Avg	Lng	TD	PD	FF	Fum	FR	Yds	TD
2017	SF	9	0	10	8	2	0.0	1	0	0	0.0	0	0	1	0	0	0	0	0
2018	SF	10	4	17	11	6	0.0	1	0	0	0.0	0	0	0	0	0	0	0	0
2019	SF	11	11	23	19	4	2.0	4	0	0	0.0	0	0	0	1	0	0	0	0
2020	SF	14	14	20	14	6	**3.0**	7	0	0	0.0	0	0	1	0	0	0	0	0
2021	SF	**17**	**17**	**56**	**40**	16	2.0	**10**	0	0	0.0	0	0	1	2	0	0	0	0
2022	DEN	15	15	34	22	12	2.0	3	0	0	0.0	0	0	**6**	0	0	0	0	0
2023	DEN	16	16	46	30	16	2.0	5	0	0	0.0	0	0	0	**3**	0	**2**	**14**	0
2024	DEN	**17**	**17**	42	21	**21**	1.0	1	0	0	0.0	0	0	3	0	0	1	0	0
2025	DEN	16	14	39	21	18	**3.0**	4	0	0	0.0	0	0	1	0	0	0	0	0
Career		125	108	287	186	101	15.0	36	0	0	0.0	0	0	13	6	0	3	14	0

=== Postseason ===
Year	Team	Games		Tackles					Interceptions						Fumbles				
Year	Team	GP	GS	Cmb	Solo	Ast	Sck	TFL	Int	Yds	Avg	Lng	TD	PD	FF	Fum	FR	Yds	TD
2021	SF	**3**	**3**	**8**	4	**4**	1.0	1	0	0	0.0	0	0	0	0	0	0	0	0
2024	DEN	1	0	7	**5**	2	1.0	1	0	0	0.0	0	0	0	0	0	0	0	0
2025	DEN	2	2	6	2	**4**	**1.5**	**2**	0	0	0.0	0	0	0	0	0	0	0	0
Career		6	5	21	11	10	3.5	4	0	0	0.0	0	0	0	0	0	0	0	0

== Personal life ==
On October 7, 2019, Jones and his girlfriend, Kayla Fannin, got engaged on the field at Levi's Stadium in the hours leading up to the kickoff against the Cleveland Browns. Jones decided to pop the question to his girlfriend, Kayla Fannin, ahead of the San Francisco 49ers' Monday Night Football matchup. Fannin and family gathered on the sidelines for pregame photos when Jones distracted his girlfriend and dropped to a knee behind her. The emotional affair was featured on the video boards across Levi's Stadium.

In 2020, Jones announced, on Instagram, his marriage to Kayla and wedding pictures were posted.
