= Jerry Rosburg =

American football coach (born 1955)

Personal information
- Born: November 24, 1955 (age 70); Fairmont, Minnesota, U.S.

Career information
- High school: Fairmont
- College: North Dakota State (1974–1978)

Career history
- Shanley High School (1979–1980) Assistant; Northern Michigan (1981–1986) Graduate assistant; Western Michigan (1987–1991) Linebackers coach; Cincinnati (1992–1995) Linebackers coach; Minnesota (1996) Secondary coach; Boston College (1997–1998) Secondary coach; Notre Dame (1999–2000) Cornerbacks/special teams coordinator; Cleveland Browns (2001–2006) Special teams coordinator; Atlanta Falcons (2007) Special teams coordinator; Baltimore Ravens (2008–2018) Special teams coordinator/assistant head coach; Denver Broncos (2022) Senior assistant; Denver Broncos (2022) Interim head coach

Awards and highlights
- Super Bowl champion (XLVII)

Head coaching record
- Regular season: 1–1 (.500)
- Coaching profile at Pro Football Reference

Jerry Rosburg (born November 24, 1955) is an American football coach. He was the interim head coach for the Denver Broncos of the National Football League (NFL) in 2022. In 2008, Rosburg was hired as assistant head coach/special teams coach for the Baltimore Ravens. He was part of the Ravens' coaching staff on the team that won Super Bowl XLVII.

== Early life and playing career ==
Rosburg graduated from Fairmont High School in 1974. He then attended North Dakota State University, where he played linebacker for the Bison. As a senior in 1978, Rosburg was named as an All-American selection.

== Coaching career ==
=== Early years ===
In 1979, Rosburg became an assistant at Shanley High School. Two years later, he became a graduate assistant coach at Northern Michigan, receiving his master's degree in 1983. Rosburg continued at Northern Michigan until taking a position as the linebackers coach at Western Michigan in 1987. In 1992, he moved from Western Michigan to Cincinnati as the linebackers coach. In 1996, Rosburg became the secondary coach at Minnesota before moving to Boston College to become the secondary coach the following year. In 1999, he became the outside linebackers and special teams coach at Notre Dame, the team would make the Fiesta Bowl in 2000.

=== NFL ===
==== Cleveland Browns ====
In 2001, Rosburg was named as the special teams coordinator for the Cleveland Browns of the National Football League (NFL).

==== Atlanta Falcons ====
In 2007, Rosburg was hired as the special teams coordinator for the Atlanta Falcons.

==== Baltimore Ravens ====
In 2008, Rosburg was named as the assistant head coach and special teams coordinator for the Baltimore Ravens of the National Football League (NFL). In 2012, Rosberg recruited Justin Tucker in as a rookie free agent, who went on to become the #1 field goal kicker in 2013. Rosburg won his first Super Bowl title when the Ravens defeated the San Francisco 49ers in Super Bowl XLVII. In 2014, he was named the special teams coordinator and associate head coach for the Ravens. The Ravens were ranked as the number 1 special teams unit in 2015.

On March 15, 2019, Rosburg announced that he was retiring from coaching. Rosburg coached at the college and professional level for 40 years and finished his career having been with the Ravens for eleven seasons.

==== Denver Broncos ====
Rosburg was hired by the Denver Broncos in 2022 to serve as an assistant to their new head coach Nathaniel Hackett. On December 26, 2022, following the firing of Hackett, Rosburg was named as the interim head coach of the Broncos. Rosburg went 1–1 in his two games as interim head coach, and parted ways with the team following the season.

== Personal life ==
Rosburg's son, Jerad, is a professional ice hockey player for the Dallas Stars of the National Hockey League (NHL).

== Head coaching record ==
Team	Year	Regular season					Postseason			
Team	Year	Won	Lost	Ties	Win %	Finish	Won	Lost	Win %	Result
DEN*	2022	1	1	0	.500	4th in AFC West	—	—	—	—
Total		1	1	0	.500		0	0	.000	

* Interim head coach
