= Jacob Bobenmoyer =

American football player (born 1997)

Profile
- Position: Long snapper

Personal information
- Born: May 28, 1997 (age 29); Cheyenne, Wyoming, U.S.
- Listed height: 6 ft 1 in (1.85 m)
- Listed weight: 235 lb (107 kg)

Career information
- High school: Cheyenne East
- College: Northern Colorado (2015–2018)
- NFL draft: 2019: undrafted

Career history
- Denver Broncos (2019–2022); Las Vegas Raiders (2023–2025); Jacksonville Jaguars (2026); Indianapolis Colts (2026)*
- * Offseason or practice squad member only

Career NFL statistics as of 2025
- Games played: 97
- Total tackles: 22
- Fumble recoveries: 1
- Stats at Pro Football Reference

Jacob Bobenmoyer (born May 28, 1997) is an American professional football long snapper. He played college football for the Northern Colorado Bears.

== Early life and college ==
Bobenmoyer attended Cheyenne East High School in Cheyenne, Wyoming, where he played tight end and linebacker. After suffering a foot injury in high school, Bobenmoyer practiced long snapping drills in place of workouts. At Northern Colorado, he played linebacker in addition to long snapper. He won the starting long snapper job at Northern Colorado as a freshman after he told his friend that he could snap better than the Bears starter and the friend told the coaches that "Jacob Bobenmoyer could snap". He was named to Phil Steele's Football Championship Subdivision All-American team in 2018 as a long snapper.

== Professional career ==
Pre-draft measurables
Height	Weight	Arm length	Hand span	Wingspan	40-yard dash	10-yard split	20-yard split	20-yard shuttle	Three-cone drill	Vertical jump
6 ft 0 3/4 in (1.85 m)	238 lb (108 kg)	30 3/8 in (0.77 m)	9 3/4 in (0.25 m)	6 ft 1 1/4 in (1.86 m)	4.82 s	1.63 s	2.74 s	4.53 s	7.32 s	31.0 in (0.79 m)
All values from Pro Day

=== Denver Broncos ===
After going undrafted in the 2019 NFL draft, Bobenmoyer accepted an invitation to the Denver Broncos rookie minicamp. Competing with Casey Kreiter, he was unable to win the long snapping job and was released before the start of the 2019 season. Bobenmoyer re-signed with the Broncos on March 11, 2020.

In Week 5 of the 2022 season, Bobenmoyer suffered a hand/wrist injury and was placed on injured reserve on October 10, 2022. He was activated on November 19.

=== Las Vegas Raiders ===
On March 17, 2023, Bobenmoyer signed with the Las Vegas Raiders.

=== Jacksonville Jaguars ===
On October 12, 2026, Bobenmoyer signed with the Jacksonville Jaguars practice squad following an injury to long snapper Ross Matiscik. He was released on November 2.

=== Indianapolis Colts ===
On November 10, 2026, Bobenmoyer was signed to the Indianapolis Colts practice squad. He was released on November 20.

== NFL career statistics ==
Legend
**Bold**	Career high

=== Regular season ===
Year	Team	Games		Tackles					Interceptions						Fumbles				
Year	Team	GP	GS	Cmb	Solo	Ast	Sck	TFL	Int	Yds	Avg	Lng	TD	PD	FF	Fum	FR	Yds	TD
2020	DEN	16	0	3	2	1	0.0	0	0	0	0.0	0	0	0	0	0	**1**	0	0
2021	DEN	17	0	**4**	2	2	0.0	0	0	0	0.0	0	0	0	0	0	0	0	0
2022	DEN	13	0	**4**	2	2	0.0	0	0	0	0.0	0	0	0	0	0	0	0	0
2023	LV	17	0	3	1	2	0.0	0	0	0	0.0	0	0	0	0	0	0	0	0
2024	LV	17	0	**4**	**3**	1	0.0	0	0	0	0.0	0	0	0	0	0	0	0	0
2025	LV	17	0	**4**	1	**3**	0.0	0	0	0	0.0	0	0	0	0	0	0	0	0
Career		97	0	22	11	11	0.0	0	0	0	0.0	0	0	0	0	0	1	0	0
