= Damarri Mathis =

American football player (born 1999)

No. 37 – Cleveland Browns
- Position: Cornerback
- Roster status: Injured reserve

Personal information
- Born: April 12, 1999 (age 27); Lakeland, Florida, U.S.
- Listed height: 5 ft 11 in (1.80 m)
- Listed weight: 195 lb (88 kg)

Career information
- High school: Lakeland Senior
- College: Pittsburgh (2017–2021)
- NFL draft: 2022: 4th round, 115th overall pick

Career history
- Denver Broncos (2022–2024); Carolina Panthers (2025); Cleveland Browns (2026–present)

Career NFL statistics as of 2025
- Total tackles: 103
- Pass deflections: 9
- Stats at Pro Football Reference

Damarri Deshon Mathis (born April 12, 1999) is an American professional football cornerback for the Cleveland Browns of the National Football League (NFL). He played college football for the Pittsburgh Panthers and was selected by the Denver Broncos in the fourth round of the 2022 NFL draft.

== Early life ==
Mathis grew up in Lakeland, Florida and attended Lakeland Senior High School. Mathis was rated a three-star recruit and initially committed to play college football at South Carolina. He later decommitted from South Carolina and signed to play at Pittsburgh.

== College career ==
Mathis played in nine games as a freshman, appearing mostly on special teams. Mathis played in all 13 of Pittsburgh's games with 10 starts in his junior season and recorded 23 tackles 23 tackles with 11 passes broken up and two interceptions. He suffered a non-football related shoulder injury prior to his senior season and used a medical redshirt. In his fifth season, Mathis played in 13 games and had 44 tackles, with six passes broken up and two interceptions, one of which he returned for a touchdown, and was named honorable mention All-Atlantic Coast Conference. After the conclusion of his college career, he played in the 2022 Senior Bowl.

== Professional career ==
Pre-draft measurables
Height	Weight	Arm length	Hand span	Wingspan	40-yard dash	10-yard split	20-yard split	20-yard shuttle	Vertical jump	Broad jump	Bench press
5 ft 11 in (1.80 m)	196 lb (89 kg)	31 7/8 in (0.81 m)	8 1/4 in (0.21 m)	6 ft 5 1/2 in (1.97 m)	4.39 s	1.54 s	2.58 s	4.22 s	43.5 in (1.10 m)	11 ft 1 in (3.38 m)	15 reps
All values from NFL Combine/Pro Day

=== Denver Broncos ===
Mathis was selected by the Denver Broncos in the fourth round, 115th overall, of the 2022 NFL draft.

After a strong rookie season in 2022, Mathis entered the 2023 season as the Broncos second starting cornerback opposite Patrick Surtain II. Following the Broncos' historic 70–20 loss to the Miami Dolphins in Week 3, however, he was benched in favor of veteran Fabian Moreau.

Ahead of the 2024 season, Mathis participated in a camp battle with second-year cornerback Riley Moss, rookie Kris Abrams-Draine, and newly signed veteran Levi Wallace. Moss was eventually named the starter, with Mathis serving as a backup. On August 27, 2024, Mathis was placed on short-term injured reserve by the Broncos following an ankle injury sustained in Week 3 of the preseason. He was activated on October 17, mainly playing on special teams and as a dimeback for the remainder of the season.

On August 25, 2025, Mathis was waived by the Broncos.

=== Carolina Panthers ===
On August 27, 2025, Mathis was claimed off waivers by the Carolina Panthers. He suffered a torn ACL in practice and was placed on injured reserve on September 6, ending his season.

=== Cleveland Browns ===
On July 21, 2026, Mathis was signed by the Cleveland Browns. He was placed on injured reserve with an undisclosed knee injury on August 11.
