= Damarea Crockett =

American football player (born 1997)

Profile
- Position: Running back

Personal information
- Born: December 22, 1997 (age 28); Magnolia, Arkansas, U.S.
- Listed height: 6 ft 0 in (1.83 m)
- Listed weight: 225 lb (102 kg)

Career information
- High school: Little Rock Christian Academy (AR)
- College: Missouri
- NFL draft: 2019: undrafted

Career history
- Houston Texans (2019)*; Oakland Raiders (2019)*; Green Bay Packers (2019–2020)*; Denver Broncos (2020–2022); New York Jets (2023)*; BC Lions (2024)*
- * Offseason or practice squad member only

Career NFL statistics
- Rushing yards: 7
- Rushing average: 2.3
- Stats at Pro Football Reference

Damarea Crockett (born December 22, 1997) is an American professional football running back. He played college football at Missouri, and was originally signed by the Houston Texans as an undrafted free agent in 2019. He has also been a member of the Oakland Raiders, Green Bay Packers, Denver Broncos and New York Jets.

== Early life ==
Crockett attended Little Rock Christian Academy in Little Rock, Arkansas. As a senior, he rushed for 1,475 yards and 22 touchdowns on 227 carries. He led the Warriors to a home field advantage playoff run that would eventually be ended into the semi-finals to their instate rivals Pulaski Academy. Crockett initially committed to play college football at Boise State University. However, he eventually flipped his commitment to the University of Missouri.

== College career ==
In 2016, as a freshman, Crockett played in 11 of Missouri's 12 games, and set Missouri freshman records for rushing yards in a season (1,062), rushing touchdowns in a season (ten), and rushing yards in a single game (225). He was suspended for the Missouri's last game of the season after he was arrested for possession of marijuana.

As a sophomore in 2017, Crockett started the year as Missouri's starting running back before a shoulder injury ended his season after six games. In those six games, he had rushed for 481 yards and two touchdowns on eighty carries.

In 2018, as a junior, Crockett returned healthy and played in Missouri's first 11 games before missing the last two due to toe and ankle injuries. He rushed for 709 yards and seven touchdowns on 147 carries.

After the season, Crockett declared for the 2019 NFL draft.

== Professional career ==
Pre-draft measurables
Height	Weight	Arm length	Hand span	40-yard dash	10-yard split	20-yard split	20-yard shuttle	Three-cone drill	Vertical jump	Broad jump	Bench press
5 ft 9 3/4 in (1.77 m)	225 lb (102 kg)	32 in (0.81 m)	9 5/8 in (0.24 m)	4.50 s	1.57 s	2.57 s	4.32 s	7.43 s	37.0 in (0.94 m)	9 ft 11 in (3.02 m)	21 reps
All values from Pro Day

=== Houston Texans ===
Crockett signed with the Houston Texans as an undrafted free agent following the 2019 draft. The Texans waived him on August 31 during final roster cuts.

=== Oakland Raiders ===
On September 2, 2019, Crockett was signed to the Oakland Raiders practice squad. He was released on October 14.

=== Green Bay Packers ===
On October 16, 2019, Crockett was signed to the Green Bay Packers practice squad. He signed a reserve/future contract with the Packers on January 21, 2020.

Crockett was waived on September 5, 2020, and was signed to the practice squad the following day. He was released on September 10.

=== Denver Broncos ===
On October 22, 2020, Crockett was signed to the Denver Broncos practice squad. He signed a reserve/future contract on January 4, 2021.

On August 31, 2021, Crockett was waived by the Broncos and re-signed to the practice squad the next day. He was promoted to the active roster on September 22. He was waived on October 26, and re-signed to the practice squad. He was promoted to the active roster on December 4. He was waived on December 21 and re-signed to the practice squad. He signed a reserve/future contract with the Broncos on January 10, 2022.

On August 2, 2022, Crockett went down with a torn ACL during a training camp practice, alongside Tim Patrick, ending both of their seasons prematurely. He was placed on injured reserve the following day. Crockett was waived on June 5, 2023.

=== New York Jets ===
On July 21, 2023, Crockett signed with the New York Jets. He was released by the Jets on August 17.

=== BC Lions ===
On April 2, 2024, Crockett signed with the BC Lions, in the CFL. On May 12, Crockett was placed on the reserve/suspended list by the CFL. He was not returned to the Lions' roster before the end of the season, and remains off of it to date.
