= Jonas Griffith =

American football player (born 1997)

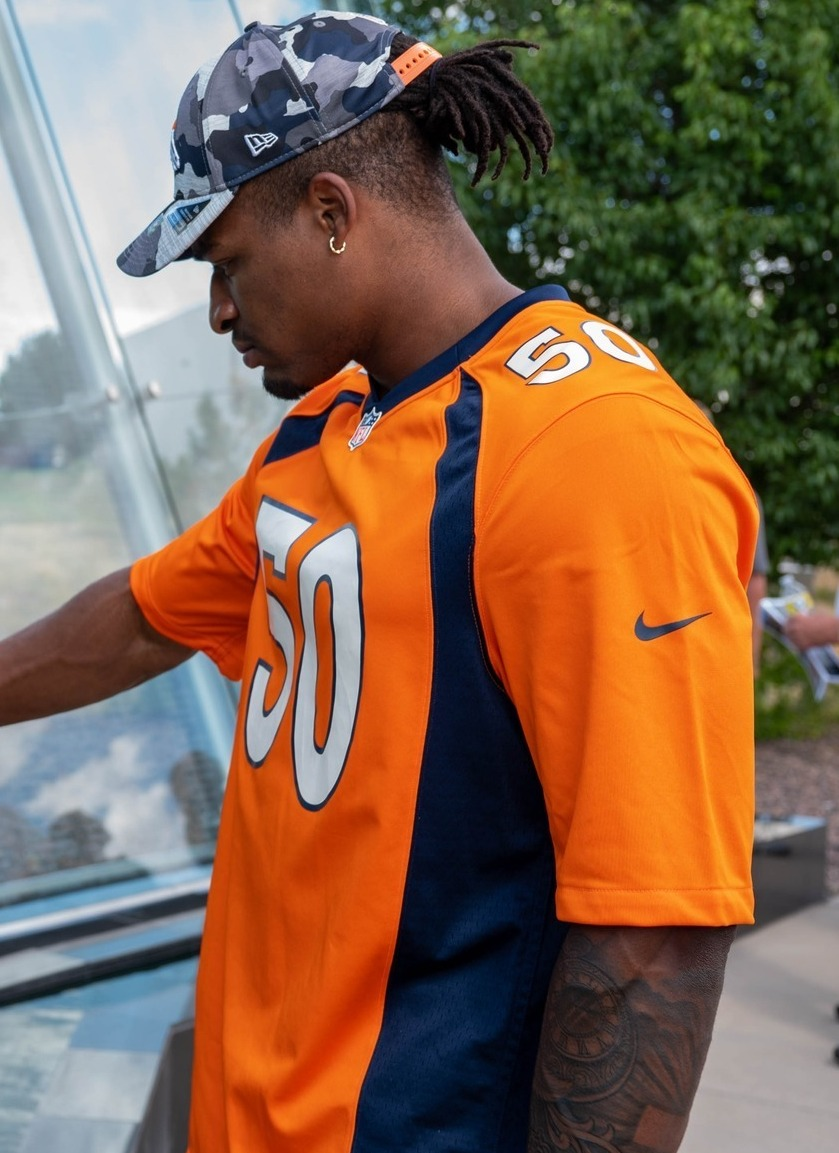
- Griffith with the Denver Broncos in 2022

Profile
- Position: Linebacker

Personal information
- Born: January 27, 1997 (age 29); Louisville, Kentucky, U.S.
- Listed height: 6 ft 4 in (1.93 m)
- Listed weight: 250 lb (113 kg)

Career information
- High school: The Academy @ Shawnee (Louisville, Kentucky)
- College: Indiana State (2015–2019)
- NFL draft: 2020: undrafted

Career history
- San Francisco 49ers (2020)*; Indianapolis Colts (2020)*; San Francisco 49ers (2020–2021)*; Denver Broncos (2021–2023); New York Giants (2025)*
- * Offseason or practice squad member only

Career NFL statistics as of 2023
- Total tackles: 92
- Fumble recoveries: 1
- Pass deflections: 1
- Interceptions: 1
- Stats at Pro Football Reference

Jonas Griffith (born January 27, 1997) is an American professional football linebacker. He played college football for the Indiana State Sycamores. He has previously played in the National Football League (NFL) for the Denver Broncos.

== College career ==
Griffith spent four years at Indiana State where in 44 career games, registered 382 tackles (200 solo), 28.5 tackles for loss, 14.0 sacks, three interceptions, nine passes defensed, four forced fumbles and three fumble recoveries, finishing his career with six All-American honors, which tied for the most in program history.

== Professional career ==
Pre-draft measurables
Height	Weight	Arm length	Hand span
6 ft 3 in (1.91 m)	247 lb (112 kg)	32 3/4 in (0.83 m)	9 3/4 in (0.25 m)
All values from Pro Day

=== San Francisco 49ers (first stint) ===
On April 25, 2020, Griffith was signed by the San Francisco 49ers as an undrafted free agent and was waived on August 20.

=== Indianapolis Colts ===
On October 7, 2020, Griffith was signed by the Indianapolis Colts to the practice squad and was released six days later.

=== San Francisco 49ers (second stint) ===
On October 21, 2020, the 49ers signed Griffith to the practice squad, where he spent the rest of the season.

On January 4, 2021, the 49ers signed Griffith to a reserve/future contract. That preseason, he ranked third on the 49ers with nine defensive tackles while leading 49ers in special teams tackles and also having two passes defensed.

=== Denver Broncos ===
On August 31, 2021, Griffith was traded, alongside a 2022 seventh-round pick, to the Denver Broncos in exchange for a 2022 sixth-round pick and a 2023 seventh-round pick. He was placed on injured reserve on September 28, 2021. He was activated on October 30. After an impressive showing, 13 appearances and 4 starts, during the 2021 season; Denver tendered Griffith an exclusive-rights free agent offer.

Griffith entered the 2022 season as a starting linebacker for the Broncos. He played in nine games before being placed on injured reserve on November 19, 2022.

On August 3, 2023, it was announced that Griffith had suffered a torn ACL in practice and would miss the entire 2023 season. He was placed on injured reserve later that day.

On August 27, 2024, Griffith was released by the Broncos. On August 30, Griffith announced that he would have to undergo a second ACL surgery.

=== New York Giants ===
On October 13, 2025, Griffith signed with the New York Giants practice squad. He was released on October 21.

== Personal life ==
Griffith is a Christian. In college, he studied criminology and criminal justice.
