= 2020 Denver Broncos season =

American football team season

- Owner: The Bowlen family (via Pat Bowlen’s estate)
- General manager: John Elway
- Head coach: Vic Fangio
- Home stadium: Empower Field at Mile High

Results
- Record: 5–11
- Division place: 4th AFC West
- Playoffs: Did not qualify
- All-Pros: OT Garett Bolles (2nd team)
- Pro Bowlers: OLB Bradley Chubb; FS Justin Simmons

Uniform
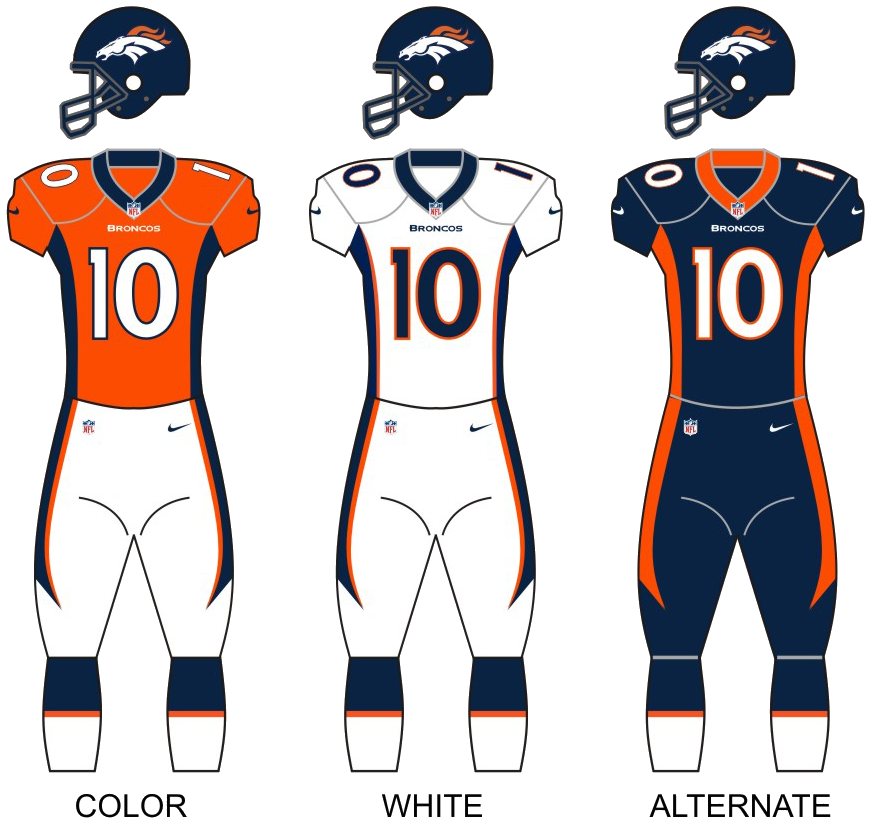

The 2020 season was the Denver Broncos' 51st in the National Football League (NFL), their 61st overall and their second under head coach Vic Fangio. It also marked the team's 20th season playing their home games in their current venue, Empower Field at Mile High, as well as the 10th and final season with John Elway serving as the general manager.

The Broncos failed to improve on their 7–9 record from 2019, while decimated by numerous injuries and struggling with poor offensive performances, ranking in the bottom quarter in several statistical categories. The Broncos suffered their fourth consecutive losing season—the team's second-longest streak behind 1963–1972, and missed the playoffs for a fifth consecutive season—tied with 2006–2010 for the second-longest streak in franchise history, behind 1960–1976. In addition, it was the Broncos' second season of 11 or more losses in four seasons, after only having two such seasons from 1990 to 2016. For the first time since 2010, the Broncos were unable to win two consecutive games in consecutive weeks without a bye.

== Coaching changes ==
- January 10: Outside linebackers coach Brandon Staley departed to become the defensive coordinator of the Los Angeles Rams.
- January 12: Offensive coordinator Rich Scangarello was fired after only one season, following a 2019 season in which the Broncos ranked in the bottom five in several offensive categories, including scoring offense and total yardage. Two days later (January 14), Scangarello was replaced by Pat Shurmur, who served as the New York Giants' head coach during the previous two seasons. Shurmur will become the Broncos' fifth offensive coordinator in as many seasons.
- January 15: Quarterbacks coach T. C. McCartney was fired after only one season.
- January 28: Mike Shula, who served as the Giants' offensive coordinator in 2018 and 2019 alongside Pat Shurmur, was named quarterbacks coach.
- February 6: John Pagano was named outside linebackers coach, replacing Brandon Staley. Pagano worked in the same position with the Houston Texans during the previous two seasons.

== Roster changes ==
=== Future contracts ===
All players listed below were signed to reserve/future contracts on December 31, 2019, unless noted otherwise. The signings include all ten players who were on the practice squad of the final roster at the end of the 2019 season. Each player was officially added to the active roster on March 18—the first day of the 2020 league year.

Position	Player	Notes
OT	Ka'John Armstrong	waived April 28
WR	Trinity Benson	waived September 5, assigned to the practice squad on September 6
LB	Malik Carney	waived September 5
RB	Jeremy Cox	waived September 5, assigned to the practice squad on September 6, promoted to the active roster on October 31
LB	Tre' Crawford	waived July 27
P	Trevor Daniel	waived April 23
TE	Bug Howard	waived April 27
OT	Tyler Jones	signed January 15, waived September 5
S	P. J. Locke	waived September 5, assigned to the practice squad on September 6, promoted to the active roster on September 24
WR	Kelvin McKnight	waived July 27
RB	Khalfani Muhammad	waived July 27
S	Tyvis Powell	waived April 27
QB	Brett Rypien	waived September 5, assigned to the practice squad on September 6, promoted to the active roster on September 25
S	Kahani Smith	waived July 27
DT	Jay-Tee Tiuli	waived April 27
LS	Wes Farnsworth	waived August 27

=== Free agents ===
==== Unrestricted ====
Position	Player	2020 team	Notes
QB	Brandon Allen	Cincinnati Bengals	signed with the Bengals on August 1
LB	Jeremiah Attaochu	Denver Broncos	re-signed March 23
CB	De'Vante Bausby	Denver Broncos	originally an RFA, re-signed March 20, waived September 5, assigned to the practice squad on September 6, promoted to the active roster on September 18, released October 24, claimed off waivers on November 10
RB	Devontae Booker	Las Vegas Raiders	signed with the Raiders on May 7
DE	Adam Gotsis	Jacksonville Jaguars	signed with the Jaguars on August 2
CB	Chris Harris, Jr.	Los Angeles Chargers	signed with the Chargers on March 18
NT	Shelby Harris	Denver Broncos	re-signed March 27
DE	Joel Heath	TBD	originally an RFA, re-signed March 27, waived July 27, re-signed and placed on the Reserve/Higher Risk Opt-Out list on August 25
CB	Cyrus Jones	TBD	
LB	Joseph Jones	Denver Broncos	originally an RFA, re-signed March 27
LS	Casey Kreiter	New York Giants	signed with the Giants on April 1
G	Ronald Leary	TBD	
C	Connor McGovern	New York Jets	signed with the Jets on March 18
LB	Corey Nelson	TBD	
S	Will Parks	Philadelphia Eagles; Denver Broncos	signed with the Eagles on March 21, claimed off waivers from the Eagles on December 2
DT	Kyle Peko	TBD	originally an RFA, placed on the Reserve/Higher Risk Opt-Out list on July 28
RB	Theo Riddick	Las Vegas Raiders	signed with the Raiders on August 23
S	Justin Simmons	Denver Broncos	assigned franchise tag on March 13, signed one-year franchise tag on July 15
DE	Derek Wolfe	Baltimore Ravens	signed with the Ravens on March 28

Note: Unrestricted free agents who were originally Restricted Free Agents (RFA) had three accrued seasons whose contracts expired at the end of the previous season, and did not receive a qualifying offer before the start of the 2020 league year on March 18.

==== Restricted and exclusive-rights ====
Position	Player	Tag	2020 team	Notes
S	Trey Marshall	ERFA	Denver Broncos	assigned tender on March 17
WR	Tim Patrick	ERFA	Denver Broncos	assigned tender on March 17
DE	Mike Purcell	RFA	Denver Broncos	assigned tender on March 18, placed on injured reserve on October 27
OT	Jake Rodgers	ERFA	TBD	assigned tender on March 18, waived September 5, promoted to the active roster on October 10, waived November 25
WR	Diontae Spencer	ERFA	Denver Broncos	assigned tender on March 17
CB	Shakial Taylor	ERFA	TBD	assigned tender on March 17, waived July 27
S	Dymonte Thomas	ERFA	TBD	
OT	Elijah Wilkinson	RFA	Denver Broncos	assigned tender on March 17, placed on the PUP list on July 28, activated from the PUP list on August 3, placed on injured reserve on September 29
Restricted Free Agent (RFA): Players with three accrued seasons whose contracts expired at the end of the previous season Exclusive-Rights Free Agent (ERFA): Players with two or fewer accrued seasons whose contracts expired at the end of the previous season

=== Signings ===
Position	Player	2019 team(s)	Notes
LB	Mark Barron	Pittsburgh Steelers	signed August 30, placed on injured reserve on September 23, waived December 22
LS	Jacob Bobenmoyer	None	signed March 11
QB	Blake Bortles	Los Angeles Rams	signed September 24, released October 17
LB	Anthony Chickillo	Pittsburgh Steelers	signed September 18
DE	Christian Covington	Dallas Cowboys	signed April 28, traded to the Cincinnati Bengals on September 4
OT	Demar Dotson	Tampa Bay Buccaneers	signed August 11
QB	Jeff Driskel	Detroit Lions	signed March 18
G	Graham Glasgow	Detroit Lions	signed March 18
RB	Melvin Gordon	Los Angeles Chargers	signed March 20
DE	Timmy Jernigan	Philadelphia Eagles	signed September 30, released October 20
P	Sam Martin	Detroit Lions	signed March 24
CB	Parnell Motley	None	undrafted free agent signed by the Tampa Bay Buccaneers, signed off the San Francisco 49ers' practice squad on December 16
TE	Nick Vannett	Seattle Seahawks, Pittsburgh Steelers	signed March 21
DE	DeShawn Williams	None	signed August 15, waived September 5, assigned to the practice squad on September 6, promoted to the active roster on September 25
DT	Sylvester Williams	Los Angeles Chargers	signed October 17, released October 23, assigned to the practice squad on October 24, promoted to the active roster on October 27

=== Departures ===
Position	Player	Notes
LB	Todd Davis	released September 4
QB	Joe Flacco	released March 19 with a failed physical designation
TE	Troy Fumagalli	designated as waived/injured on September 5, re-signed to the practice squad on November 9, then re-signed to the active roster.
CB	Davontae Harris	waived November 17
TE	Jeff Heuerman	released July 31
CB	Horace Richardson	waived March 5
DT	Deyon Sizer	waived April 27
P	Colby Wadman	waived April 23
DE	Billy Winn	released March 5

=== Trades ===
- March 18: Fullback Andy Janovich was traded to the Cleveland Browns in exchange for a seventh-round selection in the 2021 draft.
- September 2: Cornerback Isaac Yiadom was traded to the New York Giants in exchange for a seventh-round selection in the 2021 draft.
- September 4: Defensive end Christian Covington, signed by the Broncos in April, was traded to the Cincinnati Bengals in exchange for linebacker Austin Calitro.

=== Draft ===
2020 Denver Broncos Draft
Round	Selection	Player	Position	College	Notes
1	15	Jerry Jeudy	WR	Alabama	signed July 23
2	46	K. J. Hamler	WR	Penn State	signed July 24, placed on injured reserve on January 2
3	77	Michael Ojemudia	CB	Iowa	signed July 21
3	83	Lloyd Cushenberry	C	LSU	signed July 22
3	95	McTelvin Agim	DT	Arkansas	signed July 22
4	118	Albert Okwuegbunam	TE	Missouri	signed July 22, placed on injured reserve on November 9
5	178 *	Justin Strnad	LB	Wake Forest	signed July 22, placed on injured reserve on August 24
6	181	Netane Muti	G	Fresno State	signed July 22, placed on the NFI list on July 28, activated from the NFI list on August 3
7	252 *	Tyrie Cleveland	WR	Florida	signed July 22
7	254 *	Derrek Tuszka	LB	North Dakota State	signed July 22, waived September 5, assigned to the practice squad on September 6, promoted to the active roster on September 30, placed on injured reserve on October 27, acivated from injured reserve on December 12

*	Compensatory selection

==== Draft trades ====
Trade partner	Broncos give	Broncos receive	Source
Jacksonville Jaguars	2020 fourth-round selection (No. 137—from SF)	CB A. J. Bouye	
New England Patriots	Original 2020 sixth-round selection (No. 195)	CB Duke Dawson; 2020 seventh-round selection (No. 237—later traded to TEN)	
Pittsburgh Steelers	2019 first-round selection	2019 first-round selection 2020 third-round selection—No. 83	
San Francisco 49ers	WR Emmanuel Sanders; Original 2020 fifth-round selection (No. 156)	2020 third-round selection—No. 95; 2020 fourth-round selection (No. 137—later traded to JAX)	
Tennessee Titans	2020 seventh-round selection (No. 237—from NE)	DE Jurrell Casey	
Washington Football Team	QB Case Keenum; Original 2020 seventh-round selection (No. 229)	2020 sixth-round selection (No. 181)	

=== Undrafted free agents ===
All undrafted free agents were signed on April 26—one day after the 2020 NFL draft concluded, unless noted otherwise.

2020 Denver Broncos undrafted free agents
Player	Position	College	Notes
Essang Bassey	CB	Wake Forest	the only undrafted rookie to make the Week 1 roster, placed on injured reserve on December 9
LeVante Bellamy	RB	Western Michigan	waived September 5, assigned to the practice squad on September 6, promoted to the active roster on September 30, placed on injured reserve on October 10, waived November 25, re-signed December 26
Douglas Coleman III	S	Texas Tech	waived September 5
Kendall Hinton	WR/QB	Wake Forest	waived September 5
Darrin Paulo	OT	Utah	claimed off waivers from the New Orleans Saints on August 30, waived September 5, assigned to the practice squad on September 6
Riley Neal	QB	Vanderbilt	waived July 27
Zimari Manning	WR	Tarleton State	waived July 28
Hunter Watts	OT	Central Arkansas	waived September 5
Cody White	WR	Michigan State	signed August 23, waived September 5

=== Suspensions ===
On December 9, cornerback A. J. Bouye was suspended for six games—the last four games of 2020 and the first two games in 2021—for violating the league's policy on performance-enhancing substances.

=== Injuries ===
Position	Player	Time & type of injury	Games missed	Source(s)
LB	Mark Barron	hamstring, preseason workouts	injured reserve, Weeks 2–11	
CB	Essang Bassey	knee, Week 13	season-ending injured reserve, Week 13	
TE	Andrew Beck	hamstring, Weeks 6	injured reserve, Week 8–12	
RB	LeVante Bellamy	knee, Week 5 practice	injured reserve, Weeks 5–11	
OT	Garett Bolles	undisclosed illness, Week 14		
CB	A. J. Bouye	shoulder, Week 1	injured reserve, Weeks 2–6	
TE	Jake Butt	hamstring, Week 7	injured reserve, Week 8–16	
LB	Austin Calitro	hamstring, Week 3	injured reserve, Weeks 3–7	
LB	Bryce Callahan	foot, Week 12	season-ending injured reserve, Week 13	
DE	Jurrell Casey	torn biceps, Week 3	season-ending injured reserve, Week 3	
CB	Duke Dawson	knee, Week 14	season-ending injured reserve, Week 15	
TE	Austin Fort	knee, preseason workouts	season-ending injured reserve, Week 1	
G	Graham Glasgow	foot, Week 13	Week 14	
WR	K. J. Hamler	hamstring, preseason workouts	Week 1	
WR	K. J. Hamler	concussion, Week 16	season-ending injured reserve, Week 17	
DE	Shelby Harris	knee, Week 16	season-ending injured reserve, Week 17	
DE	Dre'Mont Jones	knee, Week 2	injured reserve, Weeks 3–6	
RB	Phillip Lindsay	toe, Week 1	Weeks 2–4	
RB	Phillip Lindsay	hip & knee, Week 15	season-ending injured reserve, Week 16	
QB	Drew Lock	bruised shoulder, Week 2	Weeks 3 & 4	
LB	Von Miller	dislocated tendon in ankle, preseason workouts	season-ending injured reserve, Week 1	
TE	Albert Okwuegbunam	torn ACL, Week 9	season-ending injured reserve, Week 10	
NT	Mike Purcell	Lisfranc fracture, Week 7	season-ending injured reserve, Week 8	
WR/RS	Diontae Spencer	shoulder, Week 6	Week 7	
LB	Justin Strnad	wrist surgery, preseason workouts	season-ending injured reserve, Week 1	
WR	Courtland Sutton	shoulder, preseason workouts	Week 1	
WR	Courtland Sutton	torn ACL, Week 2	season-ending injured reserve, Week 3	
CB	Kevin Toliver	knee, Week 14	season-ending injured reserve, Week 15	
LB	Derrek Tuszka	hamstring, Week 7	injured reserve, Weeks 8–13	
DE	DeMarcus Walker	calf, Week 2	injured reserve, Weeks 2–6	
OT	Elijah Wilkinson	hairline fracture in shin, Week 3	injured reserve, Weeks 4–10	

=== Practice squad elevations ===
Under new NFL rules for the 2020 season, teams are permitted to elevate up to two players from the practice squad to the active game day roster per week, with those designated players being allowed to return to the practice squad up to two times without being exposed to waivers. If a practice squad player is elevated to the game day roster for a third time, that player will be required to clear waivers before returning to the practice squad. Teams are also permitted to protect a maximum of four practice squad players to prevent opposing teams from signing those players to their active rosters.

Week	Player(s) promoted	Source
1	S P. J. Locke, LB Derrek Tuszka	
2	RB LeVante Bellamy, LB Derrek Tuszka	
3	RB LeVante Bellamy, CB Kevin Toliver	
4	OT Jake Rodgers, LB Josh Watson	
6	RB Jeremy Cox, LB Josh Watson	
7	LB Nigel Bradham, RB Jeremy Cox	
8	WR Fred Brown, C Patrick Morris	
9	S Alijah Holder	
10	OT Quinn Bailey, TE Troy Fumagalli, LB Josh Watson	
11	TE Troy Fumagalli, S Alijah Holder, LB Josh Watson	
12	TE Troy Fumagalli, S Alijah Holder, LB Josh Watson	
13	TE Troy Fumagalli, S Alijah Holder, LB Josh Watson	
14	TE Troy Fumagalli, S Alijah Holder, LB Josh Watson	
15	Taylor Russolino, LB Josh Watson	

Notes: Josh Watson was elevated as a COVID-19 replacement from Weeks 10–15, while Troy Fumagalli and Alijah Holder were identified as COVID-19 replacements from Weeks 12–14.

== Staff ==
2020 Denver Broncos staff
Front office: Owner – Estate of Pat Bowlen; President and CEO – Joe Ellis; President of football operations/general manager – John Elway; VP of Strategic Initiatives – Brittany Bowlen; VP of Player Personnel – Matt Russell; Director of pro personnel – A.J. Durso; VP of Football Administration – Rich Hurtado; VP of Football Operation and Compliance – Mark Thewes; Director of player development – Ray Jackson; Director of college scouting – Brian Stark; Assistant director of college scouting – Darren Mougey; Head coaches: Head coach – Vic Fangio; Offensive coaches: Offensive coordinator – Pat Shurmur; Quarterbacks – Mike Shula; Running backs – Curtis Modkins; Wide receivers – Zach Azzanni; Tight ends – Wade Harman; Offensive line – Mike Munchak; Assistant offensive line – Chris Kuper; Offensive quality control – Rob Calabrese; Offensive quality control – Justin Rascati	Defensive coaches: Defensive coordinator – Ed Donatell; Defensive line – Bill Kollar; Linebackers – Reggie Herring; Outside linebackers – John Pagano; Defensive backs – Renaldo Hill; Defensive assistant – Chris Beake; Assistant to head coach/defensive quality control – Mike Hiestand; Defensive quality control – Nathaniel Willingham; Special teams coaches: Special teams coordinator – Tom McMahon; Assistant special teams – Chris Gould; Strength and conditioning: Head strength and conditioning – Loren Landow; Assistant strength and conditioning – Korey Jones; Assistant strength and conditioning – Anthony Lomando; Assistant strength and conditioning – Cedric Smith; Player performance assistant – Emily Zaler

== Final roster ==
2020 Denver Broncos roster
Quarterbacks (QB): 9 Jeff Driskel; 3 Drew Lock; 4 Brett Rypien; Running backs (RB): 32 LeVante Bellamy; 28 Royce Freeman; 25 Melvin Gordon; Wide receivers (WR): 16 Tyrie Cleveland; 17 DaeSean Hamilton; 10 Jerry Jeudy; 81 Tim Patrick; 11 Diontae Spencer; Tight ends (TE): 83 Andrew Beck; 80 Jake Butt; 87 Noah Fant; 84 Troy Fumagalli; 88 Nick Vannett	Offensive linemen (OL): 76 Calvin Anderson T; 72 Garett Bolles T; 79 Lloyd Cushenberry C; 78 Demar Dotson T; 61 Graham Glasgow G; 52 Netane Muti G; 66 Dalton Risner G; 71 Austin Schlottmann G/C; 68 Elijah Wilkinson T; Defensive linemen (DL): 95 McTelvin Agim NT; 93 Dre'Mont Jones DE; 57 DeMarcus Walker DE; 90 DeShawn Williams NT; 73 Sylvester Williams DE	Linebackers (LB): 97 Jeremiah Attaochu OLB; 53 Austin Calitro ILB; 91 Anthony Chickillo OLB; 55 Bradley Chubb OLB; 47 Josey Jewell ILB; 45 A. J. Johnson ILB; 43 Joseph Jones ILB; 59 Malik Reed OLB; 48 Derrek Tuszka OLB; 54 Josh Watson ILB; Defensive backs (DB): 41 De'Vante Bausby CB; 49 Nate Hairston CB; 33 Alijah Holder SS; 22 Kareem Jackson SS; 37 P. J. Locke SS; 36 Trey Marshall FS; 42 Parnell Motley CB; 23 Michael Ojemudia CB; 27 Will Parks FS; 31 Justin Simmons FS; Special teams (ST): 46 Jacob Bobenmoyer LS; 6 Sam Martin P; 8 Brandon McManus K	Practice squad: 75 Quinn Bailey T; 12 Trinity Benson WR; 19 Fred Brown WR; 38 Chris Cooper SS; 35 Jeremy Cox FB; 39 Damarea Crockett RB; 77 Jon Halapio C; 2 Kendall Hinton WR; 67 Darius Kilgo NT; 82 Jordan Leggett TE; 50 Patrick Morris C (PS/I); 74 Darrin Paulo T; 1 Taylor Russolino K; 94 Deyon Sizer DE; Reserve: 34 Essang Bassey CB (IR); 21 A. J. Bouye CB (Susp.); 29 Bryce Callahan CB (IR); 99 Jurrell Casey DE (IR); 20 Duke Dawson CB (IR); 89 Austin Fort TE (IR); 13 K. J. Hamler WR (IR); 92 Jonathan Harris DE (NF-Ill.); 96 Shelby Harris DE (IR); 95 Joel Heath NT (Opt-out); 70 Ja'Wuan James T (Opt-out); 30 Phillip Lindsay RB (IR); 58 Von Miller OLB (IR); 85 Albert Okwuegbunam TE (IR); 90 Kyle Peko NT (Opt-out); 98 Mike Purcell NT (IR); 40 Justin Strnad ILB (IR); 14 Courtland Sutton WR (IR); 26 Kevin Toliver CB (IR); Rookies in italics 53 active, 19 reserve, 14 practice squad

== Preseason ==
The Broncos' preseason schedule was announced on May 7, but was later cancelled due to the COVID-19 pandemic.

Week	Date	Opponent	Venue	Result
1	August 15	San Francisco 49ers	Empower Field at Mile High	Cancelled due to the COVID-19 pandemic
2	August 22	Chicago Bears	Empower Field at Mile High	Cancelled due to the COVID-19 pandemic
3	August 29	at Los Angeles Rams	SoFi Stadium	Cancelled due to the COVID-19 pandemic
4	September 3	at Arizona Cardinals	State Farm Stadium	Cancelled due to the COVID-19 pandemic

== Regular season ==
=== Schedule ===
The Broncos' 2020 schedule was announced on May 7.

Week	Date	Opponent	Result	Record	Venue	Recap
1	September 14	Tennessee Titans	**L** 14–16	0–1	Empower Field at Mile High	Recap
2	September 20	at Pittsburgh Steelers	**L** 21–26	0–2	Heinz Field	Recap
3	September 27	Tampa Bay Buccaneers	**L** 10–28	0–3	Empower Field at Mile High	Recap
4	October 1	at New York Jets	**W** 37–28	1–3	MetLife Stadium	Recap
5 (Note: Due to multiple positive COVID-19 tests within the New England Patriots' organization, the Week 5 game at New England, originally scheduled for October 11, was pushed back by one day to October 12. Following another positive test involving the Patriots on October 11, the game would later be pushed back to Week 6, in which the Broncos were originally scheduled to host the Miami Dolphins. The game vs. the Dolphins was rescheduled to Week 11, in which the Broncos were originally scheduled to host the Los Angeles Chargers, and what was the Dolphins' original bye week. The Broncos' home meeting vs. the Chargers was rescheduled to Week 8, which was the Broncos' original bye week.)	Bye					
6	October 18	at New England Patriots	**W** 18–12	2–3	Gillette Stadium	Recap
7	October 25	**Kansas City Chiefs**	**L** 16–43	2–4	Empower Field at Mile High	Recap
8	November 1	**Los Angeles Chargers**	**W** 31–30	3–4	Empower Field at Mile High	Recap
9	November 8	at Atlanta Falcons	**L** 27–34	3–5	Mercedes-Benz Stadium	Recap
10	November 15	at **Las Vegas Raiders**	**L** 12–37	3–6	Allegiant Stadium	Recap
11	November 22	Miami Dolphins	**W** 20–13	4–6	Empower Field at Mile High	Recap
12	November 29	New Orleans Saints	**L** 3–31	4–7	Empower Field at Mile High	Recap
13	December 6	at **Kansas City Chiefs**	**L** 16–22	4–8	Arrowhead Stadium	Recap
14	December 13	at Carolina Panthers	**W** 32–27	5–8	Bank of America Stadium	Recap
15	December 19	Buffalo Bills	**L** 19–48	5–9	Empower Field at Mile High	Recap
16	December 27	at **Los Angeles Chargers**	**L** 16–19	5–10	SoFi Stadium	Recap
17	January 3	**Las Vegas Raiders**	**L** 31–32	5–11	Empower Field at Mile High	Recap

Note: Intra-division opponents are in bold text.

=== Game summaries ===
==== Week 1: vs. Tennessee Titans ====
Week One: Tennessee Titans at Denver Broncos – Game summary

Quarter	1	2	3	4	Total
**Titans**	0	7	0	9	**16**
Broncos	7	0	0	7	**14**

at Empower Field at Mile High, Denver, Colorado

- Date: September 14
- Game time: 8:10 p.m. MDT
- Game weather: Mostly clear, 79 °F (26 °C)
- Game attendance: 0
- Referee: Scott Novak
- TV announcers (ESPN): Steve Levy, Brian Griese, Louis Riddick and Lisa Salters
- Recap, Game Book

Game information

**First quarter**

- DEN – Noah Fant 9-yard pass from Drew Lock (Brandon McManus kick), 0:26. Broncos 7–0. **Drive: 10 plays, 63 yards, 4:57.**

**Second quarter**

- TEN – MyCole Pruitt 1-yard pass from Ryan Tannehill (Stephen Gostkowski kick), 9:21. Tied 7–7. **Drive: 5 plays, 23 yards, 2:23.**

**Third quarter**

- No scoring plays.

**Fourth quarter**

- TEN – Jonnu Smith 1-yard pass from Ryan Tannehill (kick failed), 13:49. Titans 13–7. **Drive: 15 plays, 82 yards, 7:02.**
- DEN – Melvin Gordon 1-yard run, 9:08. Broncos 14–13. **Drive: 9 plays, 75 yards, 4:41.**
- TEN – Stephen Gostkowski 25-yard field goal, 0:17. Titans 16–14. **Drive: 12 plays, 83 yards, 2:48.**

**Top passers**

- TEN – Ryan Tannehill – 29/43, 249 yards, 2 TD
- DEN – Drew Lock – 22/33, 216 yards, TD

**Top rushers**

- TEN – Derrick Henry – 31 rushes, 116 yards
- DEN – Melvin Gordon – 15 rushes, 78 yards, TD

**Top receivers**

- TEN – Corey Davis – 7 receptions, 101 yards
- DEN – Noah Fant – 5 receptions, 81 yards, TD

The Broncos played host to the Tennessee Titans in the second half of the Week 1 Monday Night doubleheader. After Titans' placekicker Stephen Gostkowski missed wide right on a 47-yard field goal attempt, the Broncos' grabbed the early lead, with a 9-yard touchdown pass from quarterback Drew Lock to tight end Noah Fant toward the end of the first quarter. However, on the Broncos' next possession, running back Melvin Gordon lost a fumble at the 25-yard line, and with a short field, the Titans capitalized five plays later, with quarterback Ryan Tannehill connecting with tight end MyCole Pruitt on a 1-yard touchdown pass. The Broncos earned a 1st-and-goal opportunity at the 2-yard line on their next possession, but failed to reach the end zone on all four plays. The Titans were attempting to take the lead just before halftime, however, Gostkowski's 44-yard field goal attempt was blocked by defensive end Shelby Harris.

The Broncos' offense went three-and-out on both of their third quarter possessions, with another missed field goal attempt by Gostkowski in between—from 42 yards out. The Titans took the lead early in the fourth quarter, with Tannehill throwing a 1-yard touchdown pass to tight end Jonnu Smith. However, Gostkowski missed wide left on the extra-point attempt, leaving the score at 13–7. The Broncos responded, and took a 14–13 lead, with Gordon rushing for a 1-yard touchdown at the 9:12 mark of the fourth quarter. Each team exchanged punts on their next two possessions, and the Broncos failed to convert a critical third down play, in which Lock overthrew wide receiver DaeSean Hamilton in the end zone. The Titans started their final possession with 3:05 left in the game, and reached the Broncos' 7-yard line. With 20 seconds remaining, Gostkowski atoned for his earlier missed kicks, with a 25-yard field goal to give the Titans a 16–14 win. The Broncos had one last possession, but could not advance past their own 43-yard line.

Notes:

This was the Broncos' first home loss to the Tennessee Titans since 1987, when the franchise was known as the Houston Oilers.

==== Week 2: at Pittsburgh Steelers ====
Week Two: Denver Broncos at Pittsburgh Steelers – Game summary

Quarter	1	2	3	4	Total
Broncos	0	3	11	7	**21**
**Steelers**	7	10	0	9	**26**

at Heinz Field, Pittsburgh, Pennsylvania

- Date: September 20
- Game time: 1:00 p.m. EDT/11:00 am. MDT
- Game weather: Sunny, 64 °F (18 °C)
- Game attendance: 0
- Referee: Adrian Hill
- TV announcers (CBS): Greg Gumbel, Rich Gannon and Jay Feely
- Recap, Game Book

Game information

**First quarter**

- PIT – James Conner 2-yard run, 4:23. Steelers 7–0. **Drive: 9 plays, 59 yards, 3:19.**

**Second quarter**

- DEN – Brandon McManus 49-yard field goal, 12:07. Steelers 7–3. **Drive: 5 plays, 5 yards, 2:53.**
- PIT – Chase Claypool 84-yard pass from Ben Roethlisberger (Chris Boswell kick), 6:23. Steelers 14–3. **Drive: 1 play, 84 yards, 0:11.**
- PIT – Chris Boswell 21-yard field goal, 0:39. Steelers 17–3. **Drive: 4 plays, 8 yards, 1:19.**

**Third quarter**

- DEN – Brandon McManus 28-yard field goal, 8:00. Steelers 17–6. **Drive: 10 plays, 31 yards, 3:50.**
- DEN – Noah Fant 20-yard pass from Jeff Driskel (Jeff Driskel–Noah Fant pass), 1:07. Steelers 17–14. **Drive: 6 plays, 65 yards, 2:47.**

**Fourth quarter**

- PIT – Diontae Johnson 28-yard pass from Ben Roethlisberger (Chris Boswell kick), 11:26. Steelers 24–14. **Drive: 9 plays, 75 yards, 4:41.**
- PIT – Derek Watt tackled Sam Martin for a safety, 10:01. Steelers 26–14.
- DEN – Melvin Gordon III 16-yard pass from Jeff Driskel (Brandon McManus kick), 7:43. Steelers 26–21. **Drive: 6 plays, 54 yards, 1:58.**

**Top passers**

- DEN – Jeff Driskel – 18/34, 256 yards, 2 TD, INT
- PIT – Ben Roethlisberger – 29/41, 311 yards, 2 TD, INT

**Top rushers**

- DEN – Melvin Gordon III – 19 rushes, 70 yards
- PIT – James Conner – 16 rushes, 106 yards, TD

**Top receivers**

- DEN – Courtland Sutton – 3 receptions, 66 yards
- PIT – Diontae Johnson – 8 receptions, 92 yards, TD

On the Broncos' second possession, quarterback Drew Lock was strip-sacked by Steelers' linebacker Bud Dupree, resulting in Lock leaving the game midway through the first quarter with a shoulder injury. Lock was replaced by backup quarterback Jeff Driskel. The Steelers took advantage of the Lock fumble, with running back James Conner rushing for a 2-yard touchdown. The only scoring play by the Broncos in the first half came courtesy of a 49-yard field goal by placekicker Brandon McManus, who missed wide right on a 58-yard attempt later in the second quarter. One play after an 81-yard touchdown by Steelers' return specialist Diontae Johnson on a punt return was nullified by an illegal block penalty, quarterback Ben Roethlisberger launched an 84-yard touchdown pass to wide receiver Chase Claypool. Just before the two-minute warning, Driskel was intercepted by cornerback Joe Haden, and the Steelers added a 21-yard field goal by placekicker Chris Boswell just before halftime, for a 17–3 Steelers' lead.

On the initial possession of the third quarter, Roethlisberger was intercepted by safety Justin Simmons. The Broncos' offense marched down the field and reached the Steelers' 4-yard line, but were forced to settle for a 28-yard field goal by McManus. After forcing a turnover on downs, the Broncos finally reached the end zone and narrowed the Steelers' lead to 17–14, with Driskel connecting on a 20-yard touchdown pass to tight end Noah Fant, coupled with a two-point conversion from Driskel to Fant. The Steelers responded on their next possession, with a 28-yard pass from Roethlisberger to Johnson. Broncos' punter Sam Martin fumbled a punt snap early in the fourth quarter and was tackled in the end zone for a safety, increasing the Steelers' lead to 26–14. However, the Broncos' defense forced a fumble near midfield on the Steelers' next possession, and six plays later, Driskel connected with running back Melvin Gordon on a 16-yard touchdown pass midway through the fourth quarter. The Broncos' defense forced a punt, and trailing 26–21 with six minutes remaining in the game, the Broncos started their final possession at their own 18-yard line, and reached the Steelers' 15-yard just before the two-minute warning, hoping for a go-ahead touchdown. However, after an incomplete pass, the Broncos faced a 4th-and-2, and Driskel was sacked by safety Terrell Edmunds, ending the Broncos' rally attempt. The Steelers proceeded to run out the clock.

==== Week 3: vs. Tampa Bay Buccaneers ====
Week Three: Tampa Bay Buccaneers at Denver Broncos – Game summary

Quarter	1	2	3	4	Total
**Buccaneers**	10	13	5	0	**28**
Broncos	0	10	0	0	**10**

at Empower Field at Mile High, Denver, Colorado

- Date: September 27
- Game time: 2:25 pm. MDT
- Game weather: Partly cloudy, 55 °F (13 °C)
- Game attendance: 5,226
- Referee: Land Clark
- TV announcers (Fox): Adam Amin, Mark Schlereth and Lindsay Czarniak
- Recap, Game Book

Game information

**First quarter**

- TB – Chris Godwin 10-yard pass from Tom Brady (Ryan Succop kick), 9:58. Buccaneers 7–0. **Drive: 3 plays, 10 yards, 0:43.**
- TB – Ryan Succop 43-yard field goal, 0:43. Buccaneers 10–0. **Drive: 10 plays, 30 yards, 4:40.**

**Second quarter**

- DEN – Brandon McManus 56-yard field goal, 11:33. Buccaneers 10–3. **Drive: 7 plays, 37 yards, 3:44.**
- TB – Mike Evans 1-yard pass from Tom Brady (Ryan Succop kick), 6:35. Buccaneers 17–3. **Drive: 12 plays, 75 yards, 4:58.**
- TB – Mike Evans 1-yard pass from Tom Brady (kick blocked), 2:19. Buccaneers 23–3. **Drive: 6 plays, 56 yards, 2:37.**
- DEN – Tim Patrick 7-yard pass from Jeff Driskel (Brandon McManus kick), 0:14. Buccaneers 23–10. **Drive: 8 plays, 75 yards, 2:05.**

**Third quarter**

- TB – Jeff Driskel sacked in end zone by Shaquil Barrett for a safety, 11:44. Buccaneers 25–10.
- TB – Ryan Succop 35-yard field goal, 0:00. Buccaneers 28–10. **Drive: 7 plays, 38 yards, 3:22.**

**Fourth quarter**

- No scoring plays.

**Top passers**

- TB – Tom Brady – 25/38, 297 yards, 3 TD
- DEN – Jeff Driskel – 17/30, 176 yards, TD, INT

**Top rushers**

- TB – Ronald Jones – 13 rushes, 53 yards
- DEN – Melvin Gordon – 8 rushes, 26 yards

**Top receivers**

- TB – Scott Miller – 3 receptions, 83 yards
- DEN – Jerry Jeudy – 5 receptions, 55 yards

The Broncos turned in a dismal performance in a 28–10 loss to the Buccaneers. Punter Sam Martin had a punt blocked in the first quarter, and the Broncos' defense surrendered three touchdown passes to Buccaneers' quarterback Tom Brady—two of which went to wide receiver Mike Evans. The Broncos' only scoring plays occurred in the second quarter—a 56-yard field goal by placekicker Brandon McManus and a 7-yard touchdown pass from quarterback Jeff Driskel to wide receiver Tim Patrick—the latter of which occurred after the Broncos fell into a 23–3 deficit. Driskel, starting in place of the injured Drew Lock, was sacked five times, one of which resulted in a safety. Driskel was later benched in the fourth quarter in favor of backup quarterback Brett Rypien, who drove the Broncos' offense deep into Buccaneers' territory with four minutes remaining in the game, but threw a game-sealing interception near the goal line. With the loss, the Broncos started 0–3 in consecutive seasons for the first time in franchise history. The seats were filled with cutouts of 1,800 characters from the cartoon South Park (which is set in Colorado).

==== Week 4: at New York Jets ====
Week Four: Denver Broncos at New York Jets – Game summary

Quarter	1	2	3	4	Total
**Broncos**	3	14	7	13	**37**
Jets	7	6	3	12	**28**

at MetLife Stadium, East Rutherford, New Jersey

- Date: October 1
- Game time: 8:20 pm. EDT/6:20 pm. MDT
- Game weather: Cloudy, 64 °F (18 °C)
- Game attendance: 0
- Referee: Jerome Boger
- TV announcers (NFLN): Joe Buck, Troy Aikman, Erin Andrews and Kristina Pink
- Recap, Game Book

Game information

**First quarter**

- NYJ – Sam Darnold 46-yard run (Sam Ficken kick), 11:25. Jets 7–0. **Drive: 9 plays, 75 yards, 3:35.**
- DEN – Brandon McManus 40-yard field goal, 4:45. Jets 7–3. **Drive: 10 plays, 70 yards, 6:40.**

**Second quarter**

- DEN – Jerry Jeudy 48-yard pass from Brett Rypien (Brandon McManus kick), 13:09. Broncos 10–7. **Drive: 3 plays, 70 yards, 1:44.**
- NYJ – Sam Ficken 26-yard field goal, 6:21. Tied 10–10. **Drive: 11 plays, 55 yards, 4:44.**
- DEN – Melvin Gordon 1-yard run (Brandon McManus kick), 1:37. Broncos 17–10. **Drive: 9 plays, 75 yards, 4:44.**
- NYJ – Sam Ficken 38-yard field goal, 0:15. Broncos 17–13. **Drive: 11 plays, 55 yards, 1:22.**

**Third quarter**

- NYJ – Sam Ficken 32-yard field goal, 11:23. Broncos 17–16. **Drive: 5 plays, 46 yards, 2:00.**
- DEN – Tim Patrick 7-yard pass from Brett Rypien (Brandon McManus kick), 4:31. Broncos 24–16. **Drive: 13 plays, 75 yards, 6:52.**

**Fourth quarter**

- DEN – Brandon McManus 54-yard field goal, 14:11. Broncos 27–16. **Drive: 4 plays, 8 yards, 1:41.**
- NYJ – Sam Ficken 54-yard field goal, 11:44. Broncos 27–19. **Drive: 7 plays, 39 yards, 2:27.**
- NYJ – Pierre Desir 35-yard interception return (pass failed), 10:45. Broncos 27–25.
- NYJ – Sam Ficken 36-yard field goal, 6:23. Jets 28–27. **Drive: 6 plays, 25 yards, 2:14.**
- DEN – Brandon McManus 53-yard field goal, 3:08. Broncos 30–28. **Drive: 9 plays, 40 yards, 3:15.**
- DEN – Melvin Gordon 43-yard run (Brandon McManus kick), 1:48. Broncos 37–28. **Drive: 1 play, 43 yards, 0:12.**

**Top passers**

- DEN – Brett Rypien – 19/31, 242 yards, 2 TD, 3 INT
- NYJ – Sam Darnold – 23/42, 230 yards

**Top rushers**

- DEN – Melvin Gordon – 23 rushes, 107 yards, 2 TD
- NYJ – Sam Darnold – 6 rushes, 84 yards, TD

**Top receivers**

- DEN – Tim Patrick – 6 receptions, 113 yards, TD
- NYJ – Jamison Crowder – 7 receptions, 104 yards

On the game's opening possession, Jets' quarterback Sam Darnold eluded several Broncos' defenders and scrambled for a 46-yard touchdown run. The Broncos then took a 10–7 lead, with a 40-yard field goal by placekicker Brandon McManus, followed in the second quarter by wide receiver Jerry Jeudy scoring his first NFL touchdown—a 48-yard pass from quarterback Brett Rypien, in which Jeudy wrestled an interception away from Jets' cornerback Pierre Desir near the goal line. On the Broncos' next possession, Rypien was intercepted by Desir, and Jets' placekicker Sam Ficken missed wide-left on a 46-yard field goal attempt. However, Broncos' linebacker Joseph Jones was flagged for a 15-yard personal foul penalty for unnecessary roughness on the field goal attempt, and Ficken redeemed himself with a game-tying 26-yard field goal. The Broncos re-claimed the lead, with running back Melvin Gordon rushing for a 1-yard touchdown just after the two-minute warning. Gordon was initially ruled down just short of the goal line, but overturned by a replay review. Another field goal by Ficken—from 38 yards out—narrowed the Broncos' lead to 17–13 just before halftime.

Following a 32-yard field goal by Ficken early in the third quarter, the Broncos increased their lead to 27–16, with Rypien connecting on a 7-yard touchdown pass to wide receiver Tim Patrick, followed by a 54-yard field goal by McManus on the second play of the fourth quarter. Ficken responded on the Jets' next possession, with a 54-yard field goal of his own. Rypien then threw two interceptions, the first of which was returned by Desir for a 35-yard touchdown (with an unsuccessful two-point conversion attempt), the second of which set up a 36-yard field goal by Ficken that temporarily gave the Jets a 28–27 lead with 6:33 remaining in the game. The Broncos reached the Jets' 22-yard line in eight plays, and despite Gordon being stopped for a 3-yard loss and Rypien being flagged for intentional grounding, a 53-yard field goal by McManus gave the Broncos a 30–28 lead at the 3:13 mark of the fourth quarter. The Jets reached midfield just before the two-minute warning, hoping for a game-winning drive, and faced a 3rd-and-3. However, Darnold threw an incomplete pass that was nearly intercepted by Broncos' cornerback De'Vante Bausby, and on 4th-and-3, Darnold was sacked for a 7-yard loss by linebacker Bradley Chubb. As the Broncos were trying to run out the clock and force the Jets to use their timeouts on defense, Gordon sealed the game with a 43-yard touchdown run on the first play from scrimmage. The Broncos benefitted from 15 penalties on the Jets.

==== Week 6: at New England Patriots ====
Week Six: Denver Broncos at New England Patriots – Game summary

Quarter	1	2	3	4	Total
**Broncos**	6	6	6	0	**18**
Patriots	0	3	0	9	**12**

at Gillette Stadium, Foxborough, Massachusetts

- Date: October 18
- Game time: 1:00 pm. EDT/11:00 am. MDT
- Game weather: Sunny, 58 °F (14 °C)
- Game attendance: 0
- Referee: Scott Novak
- TV announcers (CBS): Kevin Harlan, Trent Green and Melanie Collins
- Recap, Game Book

Game information

**First quarter**

- DEN – Brandon McManus 45-yard field goal, 13:02. Broncos 3–0. **Drive: 6 plays, 48 yards, 1:58.**
- DEN – Brandon McManus 44-yard field goal, 8:05. Broncos 6–0. **Drive: 4 plays, 8 yards, 1:27.**

**Second quarter**

- DEN – Brandon McManus 27-yard field goal, 12:13. Broncos 9–0. **Drive: 13 plays, 83 yards, 5:54.**
- NE – Nick Folk 41-yard field goal, 5:20. Broncos 9–3. **Drive: 12 plays, 59 yards, 6:53.**
- DEN – Brandon McManus 52-yard field goal, 0:19. Broncos 12–3. **Drive: 12 plays, 48 yards, 5:01.**

**Third quarter**

- DEN – Brandon McManus 20-yard field goal, 3:32. Broncos 15–3. **Drive: 15 plays, 83 yards, 9:07.**
- DEN – Brandon McManus 54-yard field goal, 0:37. Broncos 18–3. **Drive: 4 plays, 6 yards, 1:31.**

**Fourth quarter**

- NE – Cam Newton 1-yard run (run failed), 8:31. Broncos 18–9. **Drive: 5 plays, 65 yards, 1:43.**
- NE – Nick Folk 38-yard field goal, 3:23. Broncos 18–12. **Drive: 4 plays, 5 yards, 1:52.**

**Top passers**

- DEN – Drew Lock – 10/24, 189 yards, 2 INT
- NE – Cam Newton – 17/25, 157 yards, 2 INT

**Top rushers**

- DEN – Phillip Lindsay – 23 rushes, 101 yards
- NE – Cam Newton – 10 rushes, 76 yards, TD

**Top receivers**

- DEN – Tim Patrick – 4 receptions, 101 yards
- NE – James White – 8 receptions, 65 yards

Placekicker Brandon McManus accounted for all of the Broncos' scoring with six field goals—two in each of the first three-quarters—which gave the Broncos an 18–3 lead over the Patriots at the end of the third quarter. Two field goals came courtesy of two turnovers off the Patriots—an interception of quarterback Cam Newton on the Patriots' first possession and a forced fumble off tight end Ryan Izzo by Broncos' cornerback Michael Ojemudia in the third quarter. The Broncos' offense failed to capitalize on two red zone opportunities—one each in the second and third quarters, and had to settle on two of McManus' six field goals—from 20 and 27 yards out. Quarterback Drew Lock misfired on two potential touchdown passes to rookie tight end Albert Okwuegbunam and came up just short of the goal line on a sideline scramble. The Patriots' only scoring play throughout the first three-quarters was a 41-yard field goal by placekicker Nick Folk in the second quarter.

The only touchdown of the game occurred midway through the fourth quarter, with Newton rushing for a 1-yard quarterback sneak. Newton was initially ruled short of the goal line, but was overturned by a successful Patriots' challenge. However, Newton was denied by the Broncos' defense on the ensuing two-point conversion attempt, which would have pulled the Patriots to within a one-score deficit. Following a Lock interception, a 38-yard field goal by Folk narrowed the Broncos' lead to 18–12 with 3:27 remaining in the game. On the Broncos' next possession, Lock threw another interception on the first play from scrimmage, giving the Patriots the football on their own 28-yard line. The Patriots reached the Broncos' 24-yard line with just over a minute remaining, but the Broncos' defense subdued the Patriots' rally attempt. Despite scoring no touchdowns, this was the Broncos' first win at Gillette Stadium since 2006.

Notes

Brandon McManus' six field goals set a new franchise record for field goals in a single game. He also tied Baltimore Ravens' placekicker Justin Tucker for the most games with multiple 50-yard field goals, with six.

==== Week 7: vs. Kansas City Chiefs ====
Week Seven: Kansas City Chiefs at Denver Broncos – Game summary

Quarter	1	2	3	4	Total
**Chiefs**	10	14	6	13	**43**
Broncos	6	3	0	7	**16**

at Empower Field at Mile High, Denver, Colorado

- Date: October 25
- Game time: 2:25 pm. MDT
- Game weather: Light snow/fog, 14 °F (−10 °C)
- Game attendance: 5,314
- Referee: Brad Rogers
- TV announcers (CBS): Kevin Harlan, Jay Feely and Melanie Collins
- Recap, Game Book

Game information

**First quarter**

- KC – Clyde Edwards-Helaire 11-yard run (Harrison Butker kick), 9:08. Chiefs 7–0. **Drive: 8 plays, 68 yards, 4:02.**
- DEN – Drew Lock 2-yard run (kick failed), 6:04. Chiefs 7–6. **Drive: 4 plays, 37 yards, 1:46.**
- KC – Harrison Butker 40-yard field goal, 2:04. Chiefs 10–6. **Drive: 7 plays, 53 yards, 4:00.**

**Second quarter**

- KC – Daniel Sorensen 50-yard interception return (Harrison Butker kick), 9:18. Chiefs 17–6.
- DEN – Brandon McManus 43-yard field goal, 5:49. Chiefs 17–9. **Drive: 7 plays, 50 yards, 3:29.**
- KC – Byron Pringle 102-yard kickoff return (Harrison Butker kick), 5:35. Chiefs 24–9.

**Third quarter**

- KC – Harrison Butker 31-yard field goal, 10:21. Chiefs 27–9. **Drive: 4 plays, 1 yard, 1:03.**
- KC – Harrison Butker 26-yard field goal, 2:00. Chiefs 30–9. **Drive: 8 plays, 50 yards, 3:49.**

**Fourth quarter**

- KC – Tyreek Hill 10-yard pass from Patrick Mahomes (Harrison Butker kick), 11:15. Chiefs 37–9. **Drive: 6 plays, 57 yards, 3:33.**
- DEN – Melvin Gordon 3-yard run (Brandon McManus kick), 6:54. Chiefs 37–16. **Drive: 9 plays, 75 yards, 4:21.**
- KC – Chad Henne 1-yard run (kick failed), 2:58. Chiefs 43–16. **Drive: 7 plays, 21 yards, 3:56.**

**Top passers**

- KC – Patrick Mahomes – 15/23, 200 yards, TD
- DEN – Drew Lock – 24/40, 254 yards, 2 INT

**Top rushers**

- KC – Clyde Edwards-Helaire – 8 rushes, 46 yards, TD
- DEN – Phillip Lindsay – 9 rushes, 79 yards

**Top receivers**

- KC – Mecole Hardman – 2 receptions, 57 yards
- DEN – Albert Okwuegbunam – 7 receptions, 60 yards

Multiple mistakes doomed the Broncos in snowy and foggy conditions, in a 43–16 loss to their AFC West rivals, the Kansas City Chiefs. Running back Clyde Edwards-Helaire eluded several Broncos' defenders for an 11-yard touchdown run on the Chiefs' first offensive possession. The Broncos responded, with quarterback Drew Lock scrambling for a 2-yard touchdown (with a missed extra-point attempt by placekicker Brandon McManus). Following a 40-yard field goal by Chiefs' placekicker Harrison Butker later in the first quarter, Chiefs' safety Daniel Sorensen returned an interception off Lock 50 yards for a touchdown early in the second quarter. After a 43-yard field goal by McManus, Chiefs' return specialist Byron Pringle returned the ensuing kickoff 102 yards for a touchdown, and the Chiefs dominated the remainder of the game. Broncos' running back Phillip Lindsay rushed for 79 yards, before suffering a concussion after a helmet-to-helmet hit from Sorensen late in the first half. A lost fumble on a flea-flicker attempt between Lock and running back Melvin Gordon led to one of two field goals by Butker in the third quarter. Chiefs' quarterback Patrick Mahomes threw only one touchdown pass—a 10-yarder to wide receiver Tyreek Hill early in the fourth quarter, which gave the Chiefs a commanding 37–9 lead. The Broncos managed only one other scoring play—a 3-yard run by Gordon midway through the fourth quarter, by which time the game had been decided in the Chiefs' favor. One more Chiefs' touchdown—a 1-yard run by backup quarterback Chad Henne, put an end to a disastrous afternoon for the Broncos, who suffered their 10th straight loss to the Chiefs, dating back to 2015.

==== Week 8: vs. Los Angeles Chargers ====
Week Eight: Los Angeles Chargers at Denver Broncos – Game summary

Quarter	1	2	3	4	Total
Chargers	0	14	10	6	**30**
**Broncos**	3	0	7	21	**31**

at Empower Field at Mile High, Denver, Colorado

- Date: November 1
- Game time: 2:05 pm. MST
- Game weather: Sunny, 64 °F (18 °C)
- Game attendance: 5,231
- Referee: Carl Cheffers
- TV announcers (CBS): Greg Gumbel, Rich Gannon and Jay Feely
- Recap, Game Book

Game information

**First quarter**

- DEN – Brandon McManus 35-yard field goal, 10:02. Broncos 3–0. **Drive: 4 plays, 0 yards, 1:27.**

**Second quarter**

- LAC – Keenan Allen 9-yard pass from Justin Herbert (Michael Badgley kick), 1:48. Chargers 7–3. **Drive: 9 plays, 80 yards, 4:05.**
- LAC – Gabe Nabers 2-yard pass from Justin Herbert (Michael Badgley kick), 0:15. Chargers 14–3. **Drive: 6 plays, 80 yards, 0:56.**

**Third quarter**

- LAC – Mike Williams 24-yard pass from Justin Herbert (Michael Badgley kick), 10:13. Chargers 21–3. **Drive: 10 plays, 75 yards, 4:47.**
- LAC – Michael Badgley 52-yard field goal, 7:33. Chargers 24–3. **Drive: 8 plays, 40 yards, 1:46.**
- DEN – Phillip Lindsay 55-yard run (Brandon McManus kick), 6:05. Chargers 24–10. **Drive: 5 plays, 75 yards, 1:28.**

**Fourth quarter**

- DEN – Albert Okwuegbunam 9-yard pass from Drew Lock (Brandon McManus kick), 11:42. Chargers 24–17. **Drive: 9 plays, 80 yards, 4:54.**
- LAC – Michael Badgley 47-yard field goal, 7:57. Chargers 27–17. **Drive: 8 plays, 46 yards, 3:45.**
- DEN – DaeSean Hamilton 40-yard pass from Drew Lock (Brandon McManus kick), 7:30. Chargers 27–24. **Drive: 2 plays, 75 yards, 0:27.**
- LAC – Michael Badgley 33-yard field goal, 2:30. Chargers 30–24. **Drive: 12 plays, 60 yards, 5:00.**
- DEN – K. J. Hamler 1-yard pass from Drew Lock (Brandon McManus kick), 0:00. Broncos 31–30. **Drive: 14 plays, 81 yards, 2:30.**

**Top passers**

- LAC – Justin Herbert – 29/43, 278 yards, 3 TD, 2 INT
- DEN – Drew Lock – 26/41, 248 yards, 3 TD, INT

**Top rushers**

- LAC – Justin Jackson – 17 rushes, 89 yards
- DEN – Phillip Lindsay – 6 rushes, 83 yards, TD

**Top receivers**

- LAC – Mike Williams – 5 receptions, 99 yards, TD
- DEN – DaeSean Hamilton – 4 receptions, 82 yards, TD

On the Chargers' first possession, quarterback Justin Herbert was intercepted by cornerback Justin Simmons, who returned the football 46 yards to the Chargers' 16-yard line. However, the Broncos failed to gain any yardage, and had to settle on a 35-yard field goal by placekicker Brandon McManus. Throughout their next six possessions, the Broncos' offense was stymied by the Chargers' defense, failing to advance past their own 44-yard line (including a kneel down by quarterback Drew Lock on the last play of the first half). The Chargers scored 24 unanswered points, which included three touchdown passes by Herbert—two of them within the last two minutes of the first half, and another on the opening possession of the second half. A 52-yard field goal by placekicker Michael Badgley gave the Chargers a 24–3 lead midway through the third quarter.

However, the Broncos mounted a comeback, with running back Phillip Lindsay rushing for a 55-yard touchdown. After a Lock interception, the Broncos' defense responded, with cornerback Bryce Callahan intercepting a pass from Herbert intended for wide receiver Mike Williams in the end zone for a touchback. The Broncos narrowed the deficit to 24–17 early in the fourth quarter, with Lock connecting on a 9-yard touchdown pass to tight end Albert Okwuegbunam. Badgley added a 47-yard field goal at the 8:02 mark to increase the Chargers' lead. Following a 20-yard run by Lindsay, coupled with a 15-yard personal foul penalty on Chargers' safety Nasir Adderley, Lock threw a 40-yard touchdown pass to wide receiver DaeSean Hamilton. The Chargers then drove 60 yards in 12 plays, forcing the Broncos to call two of their timeouts on defense, and a 33-yard field goal by Badgley gave the Chargers a 30–24 lead with 2:34 remaining in the game.

The Broncos began their final possession at their own 19-yard line. Running back Melvin Gordon converted a 3rd-and-1 for a first down just after the two-minute warning. Then Okwuegbunam drew two defensive pass interference penalties on the Chargers—the first on a 3rd-and-8 at the 1:30 mark, and the other in the end zone on a 4th-and-4 that gave the Broncos the football at the 1-yard line with one second remaining in the game. In between, the Broncos were forced to use their last timeout and Lock spiked the football to stop the clock with 14 seconds remaining. Lock then connected on a game-tying touchdown pass to wide receiver K. J. Hamler as time expired. The play was reviewed, but upheld by instant replay. McManus then kicked the game-winning extra point.

==== Week 9: at Atlanta Falcons ====
Week Nine: Denver Broncos at Atlanta Falcons – Game summary

Quarter	1	2	3	4	Total
Broncos	0	3	3	21	**27**
**Falcons**	10	10	7	7	**34**

at Mercedes-Benz Stadium, Atlanta, Georgia

- Date: November 8
- Game time: 1:00 pm. EST/11:00 am. MST
- Game weather: Cloudy, 72 °F (22 °C) (retractable roof open)
- Game attendance: 7,665
- Referee: Jerome Boger
- TV announcers (CBS): Greg Gumbel, Rich Gannon and Jay Feely
- Recap, Game Book

Game information

**First quarter**

- ATL – Younghoe Koo 52-yard field goal, 9:51. Falcons 7–0. **Drive: 10 plays, 41 yards, 5:09.**
- ATL – Olamide Zaccheaus 51-yard pass from Matt Ryan (Younghoe Koo kick), 1:24. Falcons 10–0. **Drive: 11 plays, 85 yards, 5:38.**

**Second quarter**

- DEN – Brandon McManus 43-yard field goal, 12:27. Falcons 10–3. **Drive: 9 plays, 52 yards, 2:57.**
- ATL – Brandon Powell 9-yard pass from Matt Ryan (Younghoe Koo kick), 9:18. Falcons 17–3. **Drive: 9 plays, 75 yards, 4:09.**
- ATL – Younghoe Koo 35-yard field goal, 1:44. Falcons 20–3. **Drive: 12 plays, 67 yards, 5:28.**

**Third quarter**

- DEN – Brandon McManus 41-yard field goal, 11:02. Falcons 20–6. **Drive: 9 plays, 54 yards, 3:58.**
- ATL – Julio Jones 21-yard pass from Matt Ryan (Younghoe Koo kick), 6:20. Falcons 27–6. **Drive: 6 plays, 80 yards, 3:08.**

**Fourth quarter**

- DEN – Jerry Jeudy 20-yard pass from Drew Lock (Brandon McManus kick), 13:15. Falcons 27–13. **Drive: 10 plays, 70 yards, 4:03.**
- ATL – Todd Gurley 4-yard run (Younghoe Koo kick), 9:05. Falcons 34–13. **Drive: 2 plays, 12 yards, 0:31.**
- DEN – Tim Patrick 9-yard pass from Drew Lock (Brandon McManus kick), 3:53. Falcons 34–20. **Drive: 7 plays, 69 yards, 1:45.**
- DEN – Drew Lock 10-yard run (Brandon McManus kick), 1:52. Falcons 34–27. **Drive: 5 plays, 28 yards, 1:30.**

**Top passers**

- DEN – Drew Lock – 25/48, 313 yards, 2 TD, INT
- ATL – Matt Ryan – 25/35, 284 yards, 3 TD, INT

**Top rushers**

- DEN – Drew Lock – 7 rushes, 47 yards, TD
- ATL – Todd Gurley – 19 rushes, 53 yards, TD

**Top receivers**

- DEN – Jerry Jeudy – 7 receptions, 125 yards, TD
- ATL – Olamide Zaccheaus – 4 receptions, 103 yards, TD

The Falcons dominated the first half time of possession by a 2 to 1 ratio and took a 20–3 lead over the Broncos at halftime. The Falcons scored on all four of their first half possessions, and quarterback Matt Ryan dissected the Broncos' secondary with three touchdown passes to three different receivers. By the midway point of the third quarter, the Broncos trailed 27–6, with their only scoring coming by way of two field goals by placekicker Brandon McManus—a 43-yarder in the second quarter and a 41-yarder on the opening possession of the second half. The Broncos finally reached the end zone early in the fourth quarter, with quarterback Drew Lock throwing a 20-yard touchdown pass to wide receiver Jerry Jeudy. However, on the first play of their next possession, Lock was intercepted by Falcons' safety Ricardo Allen deep in Broncos' territory, giving the Falcons a very short field. Two plays later, the Falcons increased their lead to 34–13 at the 9:10 mark of the fourth quarter, with running back Todd Gurley rushing for a 4-yard touchdown. The Broncos reached the Falcons' 35-yard line in five plays on their next possession, facing a 4th-and-6, but turned the football over on downs. For the second consecutive week, the Broncos were attempting to rally from a 20+ point deficit, and after forcing a three-and-out by the Falcons' offense, the Broncos narrowed the deficit to 34–20, with Lock connecting on a 9-yard touchdown to wide receiver Tim Patrick. The Broncos' defense forced another Falcons' punt, while using two of their team timeouts, and just before the two-minute warning, Lock scrambled for a 10-yard touchdown to bring the Broncos to within a 34–27 deficit. The Broncos' defense forced a three-and-out, and without any timeouts, had one last possession at their own 20-yard line with only 44 seconds remaining. However, after three incomplete pass attempts by Lock, a fumbled snap on 4th down ended the Broncos' rally attempt.

==== Week 10: at Las Vegas Raiders ====
Week Ten: Denver Broncos at Las Vegas Raiders – Game summary

Quarter	1	2	3	4	Total
Broncos	3	3	0	6	**12**
**Raiders**	7	3	10	17	**37**

at Allegiant Stadium, Paradise, Nevada

- Date: November 15
- Game time: 2:05 pm. MST/1:05 p.m. PST
- Game weather: None (indoor stadium)
- Game attendance: 0
- Referee: Tony Corrente
- TV announcers (CBS): Kevin Harlan, Trent Green and Melanie Collins
- Recap, Game Book

Game information

**First quarter**

- LV – Josh Jacobs 11-yard run (Daniel Carlson kick), 9:44. Raiders 7–0. **Drive: 7 plays, 62 yards, 3:42.**
- DEN – Brandon McManus 50-yard field goal, 7:17. Raiders 7–3. **Drive: 8 plays, 42 yards, 2:33.**

**Second quarter**

- DEN – Brandon McManus 33-yard field goal, 8:19. Raiders 7–6. **Drive: 8 plays, 56 yards, 3:07.**
- LV – Daniel Carlson 24-yard field goal, 1:48. Raiders 10–6. **Drive: 13 plays, 81 yards, 6:31.**

**Third quarter**

- LV – Daniel Carlson 52-yard field goal, 9:20. Raiders 13–6. **Drive: 12 plays, 47 yards, 5:47.**
- LV – Josh Jacobs 5-yard run (Daniel Carlson kick), 0:36. Raiders 20–6. **Drive: 11 plays, 78 yards, 7:41.**

**Fourth quarter**

- LV – Daniel Carlson 22-yard field goal, 13:26. Raiders 23–6. **Drive: 4 plays, 7 yards, 1:26.**
- LV – Devontae Booker 7-yard run (Daniel Carlson kick), 10:00. Raiders 30–6. **Drive: 1 plays, 7 yards, 0:05.**
- DEN – DaeSean Hamilton 7-yard pass from Drew Lock (pass failed), 6:10. Raiders 30–12. **Drive: 12 plays, 75 yards, 3:50.**
- LV – Devontae Booker 23-yard run (Daniel Carlson kick), 5:59. Raiders 37–12. **Drive: 7 plays, 48 yards, 4:16.**

**Top passers**

- DEN – Drew Lock – 23/47, 257 yards, TD, 4 INT
- LV – Derek Carr – 16/25, 154 yards

**Top rushers**

- DEN – Melvin Gordon – 11 rushes, 46 yards
- LV – Josh Jacobs – 21 rushes, 112 yards, 2 TD

**Top receivers**

- DEN – Jerry Jeudy – 4 receptions, 68 yards
- LV – Darren Waller – 3 receptions, 37 yards

It was the Broncos' first-ever game in Las Vegas against the Raiders. The Broncos' only scoring plays in the first half came courtesy of two field goals by placekicker Brandon McManus—a 50-yarder in the first quarter followed by a 33-yarder in the second quarter. Near the end of the first half, a 5-yard touchdown run by quarterback Drew Lock was negated by a holding penalty on tight end Noah Fant, and Lock was intercepted on the next play. The Broncos only trailed 10–6 at halftime, but things went downhill for the Broncos in the second half, as Lock threw two more interceptions (four total in the game), wide receiver DaeSean Hamilton lost a fumble and the Raiders put the game out of reach with 20 unanswered points. The Broncos' defense surrendered four rushing touchdowns—two apiece to Raiders' running backs Josh Jacobs and Devontae Booker, and the Broncos' only touchdown was a 7-yard pass from Lock to Hamilton late in the fourth quarter.

==== Week 11: vs. Miami Dolphins ====
Week Eleven: Miami Dolphins at Denver Broncos – Game summary

Quarter	1	2	3	4	Total
Dolphins	7	3	0	3	**13**
**Broncos**	7	6	7	0	**20**

at Empower Field at Mile High, Denver, Colorado

- Date: November 22
- Game time: 2:05 pm. MST
- Game weather: Mostly sunny, 45 °F (7 °C)
- Game attendance: 5,351
- Referee: Land Clark
- TV announcers (CBS): Kevin Harlan, Trent Green and Melanie Collins
- Recap, Game Book

Game information

**First quarter**

- MIA – DeVante Parker 3-yard pass from Tua Tagovailoa (Jason Sanders kick), 10:08. Dolphins 7–0. **Drive: 5 plays, 22 yard, 2:50.**
- DEN – Melvin Gordon 1-yard run (Brandon McManus kick), 1:34. Tied 7–7. **Drive: 11 plays, 73 yard, 6:00.**

**Second quarter**

- DEN – Brandon McManus 29-yard field goal, 9:55. Broncos 10–7. **Drive: 5 plays, 48 yard, 1:54.**
- MIA – Jason Sanders 41-yard field goal, 2:39. Tied 10–10. **Drive: 14 plays, 52 yard, 7:16.**
- DEN – Brandon McManus 47-yard field goal, 0:00. Broncos 13–10. **Drive: 9 plays, 60 yard, 2:34.**

**Third quarter**

- DEN – Melvin Gordon 20-yard run (Brandon McManus kick), 2:31. Broncos 20–10. **Drive: 9 plays, 84 yard, 4:46.**

**Fourth quarter**

- MIA – Jason Sanders 53-yard field goal, 7:51. Broncos 20–13. **Drive: 7 plays, 44 yard, 2:04.**

**Top passers**

- MIA – Ryan Fitzpatrick – 12/18, 117 yards, INT
- DEN – Drew Lock – 18/30, 270 yards, INT

**Top rushers**

- MIA – Salvon Ahmed – 12 rushes, 43 yards
- DEN – Melvin Gordon – 15 rushes, 84 yards, 2 TD

**Top receivers**

- MIA – DeVante Parker – 6 receptions, 61 yards, TD
- DEN – Tim Patrick – 5 receptions, 119 yards

Following an interception by quarterback Drew Lock on the Broncos' opening possession, the Dolphins took the early lead, with quarterback Tua Tagovailoa connecting on a 3-yard touchdown pass to wide receiver DeVante Parker. The Broncos responded toward the end of the first quarter, with running back Melvin Gordon's 1-yard touchdown run. All three scoring plays in the second quarter came by way of field goals—a 29- and 47-yarder by the Broncos' Brandon McManus, with a 41-yarder by the Dolphins' Jason Sanders sandwiched in between. The Broncos took the opening possession of the second half, and reached the Dolphins' 14-yard line. However, instead of kicking a short field goal, Gordon was stopped for no gain on 4th-and-1. After forcing a three-and-out from the Dolphins' offense, the Broncos increased their lead to 20–10 late in the third quarter, with Gordon's 20-yard run—his second touchdown of the game. A struggling Tagovailoa was replaced by Ryan Fitzpatrick in the fourth quarter, and a 53-yard field goal by Sanders narrowed the Broncos' lead to 20–13 midway through the fourth quarter. The Broncos reached the 9-yard line five plays later, and were hoping to add to their lead. However, Gordon lost a fumble after Dolphins' linebacker Andrew Van Ginkel knocked the football out before Gordon reached the goal line, after the play was initially ruled a touchdown. With 5:13 remaining in the game, the Dolphins got the football back at their own 1-yard line, hoping for a rally. Fitzpatrick led the Dolphins to the Broncos' 29-yard line in nine plays; however, a pass into the end zone intended for Parker was intercepted by safety Justin Simmons just before the 2-minute warning, and the Broncos subsequently ran out the clock.

==== Week 12: vs. New Orleans Saints ====
Week Twelve: New Orleans Saints at Denver Broncos – Game summary

Quarter	1	2	3	4	Total
**Saints**	0	17	7	7	**31**
Broncos	0	0	3	0	**3**

at Empower Field at Mile High, Denver, Colorado

- Date: November 29
- Game time: 2:05 pm. MST
- Game weather: Clear, 38 °F (3 °C)
- Game attendance: 0
- Referee: Craig Wrolstad
- TV announcers (Fox): Adam Amin, Mark Schlereth and Lindsay Czarniak
- Recap, Game Book

Game information

**First quarter**

- No scoring plays.

**Second quarter**

- NO – Taysom Hill 1-yard run (Wil Lutz kick), 10:19. Saints 7–0. **Drive: 13 plays, 74 yards, 8:01.**
- NO – Taysom Hill 2-yard run (Wil Lutz kick), 1:03. Saints 14–0. **Drive: 5 plays, 13 yards, 1:19.**
- NO – Wil Lutz 40-yard field goal, 0:00. Saints 17–0. **Drive: 2 plays, 19 yards, 0:12.**

**Third quarter**

- DEN – Brandon McManus 58-yard field goal, 6:56. Saints 17–3. **Drive: 4 plays, 1 yard, 2:07.**
- NO – Latavius Murray 36-yard run (Wil Lutz kick), 2:14. Saints 24–3. **Drive: 8 plays, 82 yards, 4:42.**

**Fourth quarter**

- NO – Latavius Murray 8-yard run (Wil Lutz kick), 6:03. Saints 31–3. **Drive: 11 plays, 77 yards, 6:54.**

**Top passers**

- NO – Taysom Hill – 9/16, 78 yards, INT
- DEN – Kendall Hinton – 1/9, 13 yards, 2 INT

**Top rushers**

- NO – Latavius Murray – 19 rushes, 124 yards, 2 TD
- DEN – Royce Freeman – 8 rushes, 50 yards

**Top receivers**

- NO – Michael Thomas – 4 receptions, 50 yards
- DEN – Noah Fant – 1 reception, 13 yards

After all true quarterbacks were placed in COVID-19 protocol one day prior to the game, the Broncos were forced to turn to undrafted wide receiver and former college quarterback Kendall Hinton as the emergency quarterback, in an ugly 31–3 loss to the Saints. Hinton completed only one pass for 13 yards in 9 attempts—the fewest pass completions in a single game in franchise history, and was intercepted twice. The Broncos' only scoring play was a 58-yard field goal by placekicker Brandon McManus, which came after gaining only one yard following an interception of Saints' quarterback Taysom Hill midway through the third quarter. Otherwise, the Broncos never gained more than 24 yards on any offensive possession and did not advance past their own 47-yard line. The Broncos' 112 total yards of offense were the second-fewest of any team all season (the Washington Football Team had 108 total yards against the Los Angeles Rams in Week 5). Defensively, the Broncos surrendered four rushing touchdowns—two apiece to Hill and running back Latavius Murray.

==== Week 13: at Kansas City Chiefs ====
Week Thirteen: Denver Broncos at Kansas City Chiefs – Game summary

Quarter	1	2	3	4	Total
Broncos	3	7	6	0	**16**
**Chiefs**	3	6	10	3	**22**

at Arrowhead Stadium, Kansas City, Missouri

- Date: December 6
- Game time: 7:20 p.m. CST/6:20 pm. MST
- Game weather: Clear, 41 °F (5 °C)
- Game attendance: 12,578
- Referee: Alex Kemp
- TV announcers (NBC): Al Michaels, Cris Collinsworth, Michele Tafoya and Terry McAulay
- Recap, Game Book

Game information

**First quarter**

- DEN – Brandon McManus 53-yard field goal, 3:58. Broncos 3–0. **Drive: 12 plays, 42 yards, 5:50.**
- KC – Harrison Butker 35-yard field goal, 0:20. Tied 3–3. **Drive: 7 plays, 58 yards, 7:58.**

**Second quarter**

- DEN – Tim Patrick 5-yard pass from Drew Lock (Brandon McManus kick), 6:26. Broncos 10–3. **Drive: 7 plays, 90 yards, 4:11.**
- KC – Harrison Butker 24-yard field goal, 2:42. Broncos 10–6. **Drive: 7 plays, 69 yards, 3:44.**
- KC – Harrison Butker 23-yard field goal, 0:00. Broncos 10–9. **Drive: 5 plays, 48 yards, 0:28.**

**Third quarter**

- KC – Harrison Butker 31-yard field goal, 10:32. Chiefs 12–10. **Drive: 10 plays, 62 yards, 4:28.**
- DEN – Tim Patrick 10-yard pass from Drew Lock (pass failed), 3:50. Broncos 16–12. **Drive: 11 plays, 72 yards, 6:42.**
- KC – Travis Kelce 20-yard pass from Patrick Mahomes (Harrison Butker kick), 1:06. Chiefs 19–16. **Drive: 7 plays, 75 yards, 2:44.**

**Fourth quarter**

- KC – Harrison Butker 48-yard field goal, 1:04. Chiefs 22–16. **Drive: 10 plays, 55 yards, 5:03.**

**Top passers**

- DEN – Drew Lock – 15/28, 151 yards, 2 TD, 2 INT
- KC – Patrick Mahomes – 25/40, 318 yards, TD

**Top rushers**

- DEN – Melvin Gordon – 15 rushes, 131 yards
- KC – LeVeon Bell – 11 rushes, 40 yards

**Top receivers**

- DEN – Noah Fant – 4 receptions, 57 yards
- KC – Travis Kelce – 8 receptions, 136 yards, TD

After being outscored by the Chiefs by a combined score of 96–25 in their previous three meetings, the Broncos hung tough with the defending Super Bowl champions on Sunday Night Football. The Broncos took the opening possession and drove to the Chiefs' 34-yard line; however, a deep pass from quarterback Drew Lock to tight end Troy Fumagalli was intercepted by Chiefs' safety Tyrann Mathieu at the 10-yard line. Following an exchange of field goals in the first quarter—a 53-yarder by the Broncos' Brandon McManus and a 35-yarder by the Chiefs' Harrison Butker, the Broncos took a 10–3 lead, with a 5-yard touchdown pass from Lock to wide receiver Tim Patrick. Two short field goals by Butker within the last three minutes of the second half—from 24 and 23 yards out—narrowed the Broncos' lead to 10–9 at halftime. In between, McManus missed wide-left on a 57-yard attempt that gave that aided the Chiefs in field position to set up Butker's second field goal.

The Chiefs took a 12–10 lead on Butker's fourth field goal of the game—a 31-yarder early in the third quarter. The Broncos reclaimed the lead later in the third quarter, with Lock's second touchdown pass of the game to Patrick—a 10-yarder at the 3:50 mark of the third quarter. However, the Broncos opted for an unsuccessful two-point try, leaving the score at 16–12. Thus far, the Broncos' red zone defense had kept the Chiefs' out of the end zone, until quarterback Patrick Mahomes connected with tight end Travis Kelce on a 20-yard touchdown pass to give the Chiefs' a 19–16 lead with one minute remaining in the third quarter.

After a three-and-out to the start the fourth quarter, the Broncos' defense forced a punt after a 48-yard touchdown pass from Mahomes to wide receiver Tyreek Hill was negated by an offensive holding penalty. On the Broncos' next possession, Lock was unable to connect on two critical pass attempts to wide receivers Jerry Jeudy and K. J. Hamler, only making it to midfield and were forced to punt. The Chiefs then drove down to the Broncos' 30-yard line, and after forcing the Broncos to use the last two of their three team timeouts, a 48-yard field goal by Butker increased the Chiefs' lead to 22–16 with only 1:09 remaining in the game. The Broncos had one last possession, hoping for a game-winning drive, but after a 5-yard completion to Jeudy and two incomplete passes, Lock was intercepted by Mathieu at midfield, ending the Broncos' rally attempt and sending the Broncos to their 11th consecutive loss to the Chiefs, dating back to 2015.

==== Week 14: at Carolina Panthers ====
Week Fourteen: Denver Broncos at Carolina Panthers – Game summary

Quarter	1	2	3	4	Total
**Broncos**	6	7	12	7	**32**
Panthers	0	7	3	17	**27**

at Bank of America Stadium, Charlotte, North Carolina

- Date: December 13
- Game time: 1:00 pm. EST/11:00 am. MST
- Game weather: Partly cloudy, 70 °F (21 °C)
- Game attendance: 5,768
- Referee: Shawn Hochuli
- TV announcers (CBS): Andrew Catalon, James Lofton and Sheree Burruss
- Recap, Game Book

Game information

**First quarter**

- DEN – Diontae Spencer 83-yard punt return (kick failed), 10:18. Broncos 6–0.

**Second quarter**

- CAR – Mike Davis 3-yard run (Joey Slye kick), 6:15. Panthers 7–6. **Drive: 2 plays, 3 yards, 0:07.**
- DEN – Nick Vannett 2-yard pass from Drew Lock (Brandon McManus kick), 1:33. Broncos 13–7. **Drive: 12 plays, 75 yards, 4:42.**

**Third quarter**

- DEN – K. J. Hamler 37-yard pass from Drew Lock (kick failed), 11:04. Broncos 19–7. **Drive: 4 plays, 63 yards, 2:07.**
- CAR – Joey Slye 35-yard field goal, 6:53. Broncos 19–10. **Drive: 11 plays, 58 yards, 4:11.**
- DEN – Tim Patrick 2-yard pass from Drew Lock (pass failed), 3:35. Broncos 25–10. **Drive: 7 plays, 75 yards, 3:18.**

**Fourth quarter**

- CAR – Teddy Bridgewater 7-yard run (Joey Slye kick), 13:31. Broncos 25–17. **Drive: 9 plays, 75 yards, 5:04.**
- CAR – Joey Slye 26-yard field goal, 5:12. Broncos 25–20. **Drive: 10 plays, 74 yards, 5:03.**
- DEN – K. J. Hamler 49-yard pass from Drew Lock (Brandon McManus kick), 3:54. Broncos 32–20. **Drive: 3 plays, 75 yards, 1:18.**
- CAR – Mike Davis 10-yard run (Joey Slye kick), 3:26. Broncos 32–27. **Drive: 4 plays, 75 yards, 0:28.**

**Top passers**

- DEN – Drew Lock – 21/27, 280 yards, 4 TD
- CAR – Teddy Bridgewater – 30/40, 283 yards

**Top rushers**

- DEN – Melvin Gordon – 13 rushes, 68 yards
- CAR – Mike Davis – 11 rushes, 51 yards, 2 TD

**Top receivers**

- DEN – Troy Fumagalli – 4 receptions, 53 yards
- CAR – Robby Anderson – 8 receptions, 84 yards

The Broncos got on the scoreboard early in the first quarter, with Diontae Spencer, in his return from the COVID-19 reserve list, returning a punt 83 yards for a touchdown, though placekicker Brandon McManus missed the extra point by hitting the left upright. It was the Broncos' first punt return for a touchdown since 2015. After quarterback Drew Lock was strip-sacked by Panthers' linebacker Jeremy Chinn, defensive end Efe Obada returned the fumble to near the goal line, with Broncos' wide receiver Jerry Jeudy making a touchdown-saving tackle at the 3-yard line. This set up a 3-yard touchdown run by running back Mike Davis, which gave the Panthers a 7–6 lead midway through the second quarter. This was the only time that the Broncos trailed in the game, as Lock threw for 280 yards and four touchdowns—one apiece to tight end Nick Vannett and wide receiver Tim Patrick, and two to K. J. Hamler from 37 and 49 yards out. After Hamler's second touchdown reception, another missed extra point attempt by McManus and an unsuccessful two-point conversion after the Patrick touchdown, the Broncos led 32–20 with four minutes remaining in the game. The Panthers narrowed the Broncos' lead to 32–27 with Davis' second touchdown of the game—a 10-yard run with 3:30 remaining. Though the Broncos were forced to punt, they forced the Panthers to burn all three of their team timeouts on defense. The Panthers had one last possession at their own 27-yard line; however, following a sack of quarterback Teddy Bridgewater by Broncos' defensive end Dre'Mont Jones and two incomplete passes by Bridgewater, the Broncos' defense stopped the Panthers on fourth down just after the two-minute warning.

==== Week 15: vs. Buffalo Bills ====
Week Fifteen: Buffalo Bills at Denver Broncos – Game summary

Quarter	1	2	3	4	Total
**Bills**	7	14	17	10	**48**
Broncos	0	13	0	6	**19**

at Empower Field at Mile High, Denver, Colorado

- Date: December 19
- Game time: 2:30 pm. MST
- Game weather: 47 °F (8 °C), mostly sunny
- Game attendance: 0
- Referee: Clete Blakeman
- TV announcers (NFLN): Adam Amin, Mark Schlereth and Lindsay Czarniak
- Recap, Game Book

Game information

**First quarter**

- BUF – Dawson Knox 9-yard pass from Josh Allen (Tyler Bass kick), 4:05. Bills 7–0. **Drive: 13 plays, 59 yards, 6:05.**

**Second quarter**

- BUF – Josh Allen 24-yard run (Tyler Bass kick), 10:30. Bills 14–0. **Drive: 11 plays, 95 yards, 5:09.**
- DEN – Melvin Gordon 10-yard run (Taylor Russolino kick), 6:28. Bills 14–7. **Drive: 6 plays, 35 yards, 3:01.**
- BUF – Jake Kumerow 22-yard pass from Josh Allen (Tyler Bass kick), 1:49. Bills 21–7. **Drive: 5 plays, 59 yards, 2:26.**
- DEN – Noah Fant 6-yard pass from Drew Lock (kick failed), 0:05. Bills 21–13. **Drive: 9 plays, 75 yards, 1:44.**

**Third quarter**

- BUF – Josh Allen 1-yard run (Tyler Bass kick), 10:58. Bills 28–13. **Drive: 7 plays, 43 yards, 4:02.**
- BUF – Jerry Hughes 21-yard fumble return (Tyler Bass kick), 10:41. Bills 35–13.
- BUF – Tyler Bass 27-yard field goal, 0:44. Bills 38–13. **Drive: 10 plays, 49 yards, 4:48.**

**Fourth quarter**

- BUF – Tyler Bass 27-yard field goal, 5:46. Bills 41–13. **Drive: 12 plays, 86 yards, 7:46.**
- DEN – Melvin Gordon 8-yard run (kick failed), 1:52. Bills 41–19. **Drive: 12 plays, 75 yards, 3:54.**
- BUF – Devin Singletary 51-yard run (Tyler Bass kick), 1:44. Bills 48–19. **Drive: 1 play, 51 yards, 0:12.**

**Top passers**

- BUF – Josh Allen – 28/40, 359 yards, 2 TD
- DEN – Drew Lock – 20/32, 132 yards, TD

**Top rushers**

- BUF – Zack Moss – 13 rushes, 81 yards
- DEN – Melvin Gordon – 11 rushes, 61 yards, 2 TD

**Top receivers**

- BUF – Stefon Diggs – 11 receptions, 147 yards
- DEN – Noah Fant – 8 receptions, 68 yards, TD

The Broncos were no match for the playoff-bound Bills, in a 48–19 blowout loss. The Broncos' defensive backfield, depleted by injury and suspension, surrendered four touchdowns to Bills' quarterback Josh Allen—two passing and two rushing. The Broncos only trailed 21–13 at halftime, before the Bills blew the game open with 20 unanswered points in the second half. Broncos' quarterback Drew Lock was strip-sacked on the first possession of the second half, which resulted in a 21-yard fumble return by defensive end Jerry Hughes. The Broncos gained a total of 13 yards on the next three possessions. Lock passed for only 132 yards and one touchdown, while running back Melvin Gordon rushed for two touchdowns. With the loss, the Broncos were officially eliminated from postseason contention.

==== Week 16: at Los Angeles Chargers ====
Week Sixteen: Denver Broncos at Los Angeles Chargers – Game summary

Quarter	1	2	3	4	Total
Broncos	0	0	3	13	**16**
**Chargers**	3	10	0	6	**19**

at SoFi Stadium, Inglewood, California

- Date: December 27
- Game time: 2:05 pm. MST/1:05 pm. PST
- Game weather: Partly cloudy, 61 °F (16 °C)
- Game attendance: 0
- Referee: Shawn Hochuli
- TV announcers (CBS): Spero Dedes, Adam Archuleta and Amanda Balionis
- Recap, Game Book

Game information

**First quarter**

- LAC – Michael Badgley 37-yard field goal, 12:53. Chargers 3–0. **Drive: 5 plays, 20 yards, 2:07.**

**Second quarter**

- LAC – Austin Ekeler 9-yard pass from Justin Herbert (Michael Badgley kick), 8:23. Chargers 10–0. **Drive: 9 plays, 73 yards, 4:58.**
- LAC – Michael Badgley 43-yard field goal, 2:38. Chargers 13–0. **Drive: 9 plays, 40 yards, 3:48.**

**Third quarter**

- DEN – Brandon McManus 30-yard field goal, 5:07. Chargers 13–3. **Drive: 8 plays, 41 yards, 3:42.**

**Fourth quarter**

- LAC – Michael Badgley 25-yard field goal, 14:50. Chargers 16–3. **Drive: 11 plays, 68 yards, 5:17.**
- DEN – Brandon McManus 50-yard field goal, 11:18. Chargers 16–6. **Drive: 9 plays, 48 yards, 3:32.**
- DEN – Drew Lock 1-yard run (Brandon McManus kick), 6:31. Chargers 16–13. **Drive: 11 plays, 72 yards, 3:50.**
- DEN – Brandon McManus 52-yard field goal, 2:42. Tied 16–16. **Drive: 6 plays, 25 yards, 2:43.**
- LAC – Michael Badgley 37-yard field goal, 0:41. Chargers 19–16. **Drive: 7 plays, 56 yards, 2:01.**

**Top passers**

- DEN – Drew Lock – 24/47, 264 yards, 2 INT
- LAC – Justin Herbert – 21/33, 253 yards, TD

**Top rushers**

- DEN – Melvin Gordon – 16 rushes, 79 yards
- LAC – Austin Ekeler – 14 rushes, 45 yards

**Top receivers**

- DEN – DaeSean Hamilton – 5 receptions, 77 yards
- LAC – Mike Williams – 4 receptions, 54 yards

The Chargers built a 13–0 lead at halftime, consisting of an 8-yard touchdown pass from quarterback Justin Herbert to running back Austin Ekeler and two field goals by placekicker Michael Badgley—a 37-yarder in the first quarter and a 43-yarder in the second quarter. The first field goal was aided by a 53-yard kickoff return by Nasir Adderley. The Broncos' offense reached the red zone on their initial possession of the game, but quarterback Drew Lock was intercepted by Chargers' cornerback Casey Hayward and placekicker Brandon McManus hit the left upright on a 37-yard field goal attempt early in the second quarter. Following an exchange of punts to start the second half, a 30-yard field goal by McManus put the Broncos on the scoreboard late in the third quarter. Following a 25-yard field goal by Badgley early in the fourth quarter, McManus responded with a 50-yard field goal. After the Broncos' defense forced a three-and-out, the Broncos finally reached the end zone, with Lock's 1-yard quarterback sneak to cap off an 11-play, 72-yard drive. After forcing another Chargers' punt, a 52-yard field goal by McManus tied the game at 16–16 with 2:47 remaining in the game. However, the Broncos' defense was unable to keep the Chargers from moving down the field, and were forced to burn all three of their team timeouts. With 45 seconds remaining, a 37-yard field goal by Badgley gave the Chargers a 19–16 lead. The Broncos had one last possession, and reached midfield with one second remaining. However, Lock's desperation hail mary attempt was intercepted near the goal line, ending the Broncos' rally attempt. Wide receiver Jerry Jeudy dropped five passes, including a surefire touchdown in the third quarter.

==== Week 17: vs. Las Vegas Raiders ====
Week Seventeen: Las Vegas Raiders at Denver Broncos – Game summary

Quarter	1	2	3	4	Total
**Raiders**	3	14	0	15	**32**
Broncos	10	0	6	15	**31**

at Empower Field at Mile High, Denver, Colorado

- Date: January 3, 2021
- Game time: 2:25 pm. MST
- Game weather: Partly cloudy, 53 °F (12 °C)
- Game attendance: 0
- Referee: Scott Novak
- TV announcers (CBS): Beth Mowins and Tiki Barber
- Recap, Game Book

Game information

**First quarter**

- DEN – Brandon McManus 22-yard field goal, 9:05. Broncos 3–0. **Drive: 11 plays, 68 yards, 4:28.**
- LV – Daniel Carlson 33-yard field goal, 4:34. Tied 3–3. **Drive: 9 plays, 60 yards, 4:31.**
- DEN – Troy Fumagalli 1-yard pass from Drew Lock (Brandon McManus kick), 0:17. Broncos 10–3. **Drive: 9 plays, 75 yards, 4:17.**

**Second quarter**

- LV – Darren Waller 28-yard pass from Derek Carr (Daniel Carlson kick), 11:15. Tied 10–10. **Drive: 5 plays, 54 yards, 2:44.**
- LV – Bryan Edwards 26-yard pass from Derek Carr (Daniel Carlson kick), 0:26. Raiders 17–10. **Drive: 6 plays, 56 yards, 1:13.**

**Third quarter**

- DEN – Brandon McManus 37-yard field goal, 11:21. Raiders 17–13. **Drive: 9 plays, 57 yards, 3:39.**
- DEN – Brandon McManus 26-yard field goal, 3:07. Raiders 17–16. **Drive: 6 plays, 30 yards, 2:52.**

**Fourth quarter**

- DEN – Melvin Gordon 10-yard run (Drew Lock–Jerry Jeudy pass), 14:54. Broncos 24–17. **Drive: 5 plays, 34 yards, 2:25.**
- LV – Josh Jacobs 28-yard run (Daniel Carlson kick), 7:27. Tied 24–24. **Drive: 9 plays, 90 yards, 4:12.**
- DEN – Jerry Jeudy 92-yard pass from Drew Lock (Brandon McManus kick), 6:29. Broncos 31–24. **Drive: 3 plays, 92 yards, 0:58.**
- LV – Josh Jacobs 1-yard run (Derek Carr–Darren Waller pass), 0:24. Raiders 32–31. **Drive: 7 plays, 77 yards, 1:23.**

**Top passers**

- LV – Derek Carr – 24/38, 371 yards, 2 TD, 2 INT
- DEN – Drew Lock – 25/41, 339 yards, 2 TD

**Top rushers**

- LV – Melvin Gordon – 26 rushes, 93 yards, TD
- DEN – Josh Jacobs – 15 rushes, 89 yards, 2 TD

**Top receivers**

- LV – Darren Waller – 9 receptions, 117 yards, TD
- DEN – Jerry Jeudy – 5 receptions, 140 yards, TD

In the 2020 season finale, the Broncos forced four turnovers off the Raiders and committed none, but were unable to prevent a game-winning drive by the Raiders in the game's final minute. After an exchange of field goals by each placekicker in the first quarter—a 22-yarder by the Broncos' Brandon McManus and a 33-yarder by the Raiders' Daniel Carlson, a 1-yard touchdown pass from quarterback Drew Lock to tight end Troy Fumagalli gave the Broncos a 10–3 lead. Broncos' cornerback Michael Ojemudia forced a fumble off Raiders' tight end Darren Waller on the first play of the second quarter; however, McManus missed wide left on a 56-yard field goal attempt. Raiders' quarterback Derek Carr connected with Waller on a 28-yard touchdown pass to tie the game on the Raiders' next possession. The Broncos then drove to the Raiders' 38-yard line, facing a 4th-and-1, but turned the football over on downs. The Raiders then took a 17–10 lead, with a 26-yard touchdown pass from Carr to wide receiver Bryan Edwards. The Broncos had one last possession before halftime, and McManus attempted a 70-yard field goal, but it was blocked.

On the Broncos' first possession of the second half, a 37-yard field goal by McManus narrowed the Raiders' lead to 17–13. Following an exchange of punts, Carr was intercepted by safety Justin Simmons; however, the Broncos were forced to settle for another field goal by McManus—from 26 yards out. Ojemudia forced another fumble—this time off of wide receiver Henry Ruggs—near the end of the third quarter, giving the Broncos a short field, and five plays later, a 10-yard touchdown run by running back Melvin Gordon (with a successful two-point conversion) gave the Broncos a 24–17 lead to start the fourth quarter. Carr threw another interception on the Raiders' next possession; however, the Broncos were unable to capitalize after Lock was sacked for an 11-yard loss at the Raiders' 39-yard line, forcing a punt. The Raiders tied the score at 24–24 midway through the fourth quarter, with running back Josh Jacobs rushing for a 28-yard touchdown. On the third play of the Broncos' next possession, Lock launched a 92-yard touchdown pass to wide receiver Jerry Jeudy—the Broncos' longest pass play since 2008, though they used the first of their three team timeouts on this possession that proved to be costly toward the end of the game.

The Broncos forced a punt on the Raiders' next possession, and with 2:46 remaining in the game, were hoping to run out the clock. The Broncos earned one first down after runs of 7 and 15 yards by Gordon, who was pushed out of bounds on each play. On the next play, Gordon gained 19 yards for what would have been a game-clinching first down; however, it was nullified by an offensive holding penalty on tight end Noah Fant. Following a sack of Lock by Raiders' defensive end Maxx Crosby, a minimal 3-yard gain by Gordon and the exhaustion of all Raiders' team timeouts, the Broncos were forced to punt just after the two-minute warning.

Carr drove the Raiders down the field, and with 27 seconds remaining, faced a 4th-and-goal at the Broncos' 1-yard line. The Broncos used a highly criticized timeout prior to Jacobs rushing for a 1-yard touchdown to pull the Raiders to within 31–30. Carr subsequently connected on a successful two-point conversion to Waller to give the Raiders a 32–31 lead. Without any timeouts and 24 seconds remaining, Lock connected with Jeudy on a 25-yard completion to midfield, and a 5-yard delay of game penalty on the Raiders' defense moved the football to the Raiders' 45-yard line. Following an incomplete pass from Lock to wide receiver Diontae Spencer, McManus attempted a 63-yard field goal, however, it was blocked, giving the Raiders the win and their first season sweep of the Broncos since 2010.

=== Standings ===
==== Division ====
AFC West
	W	L	T	PCT	DIV	CONF	PF	PA	STK
^{(1)} Kansas City Chiefs	14	2	0	.875	4–2	10–2	473	362	L1
Las Vegas Raiders	8	8	0	.500	4–2	6–6	434	478	W1
Los Angeles Chargers	7	9	0	.438	3–3	6–6	384	426	W4
Denver Broncos	5	11	0	.313	1–5	4–8	323	446	L3

==== Conference ====
AFC
#	Team	Division	W	L	T	PCT	DIV	CONF	SOS	SOV	STK
**Division leaders**
1	Kansas City Chiefs	West	14	2	0	.875	4–2	10–2	.465	.464	L1
2	Buffalo Bills	East	13	3	0	.813	6–0	10–2	.512	.471	W6
3	Pittsburgh Steelers	North	12	4	0	.750	4–2	9–3	.475	.448	L1
4 (Note: Tennessee finished ahead of Indianapolis in the AFC South based on division record.)	Tennessee Titans	South	11	5	0	.688	5–1	8–4	.475	.398	W1
**Wild cards**
5 (Note: Baltimore claimed the No. 5 seed over Indianapolis based on head-to-head victory. Division tiebreaker used to eliminate Cleveland (see below).) (Note: Baltimore claimed the No. 5 seed over Cleveland based on head-to-head sweep.)	Baltimore Ravens	North	11	5	0	.688	4–2	7–5	.494	.401	W5
6 (Note: Cleveland claimed the No. 6 seed over Indianapolis based on head-to-head victory.)	Cleveland Browns	North	11	5	0	.688	3–3	7–5	.451	.406	W1
7	Indianapolis Colts	South	11	5	0	.688	4–2	7–5	.443	.384	W1
**Did not qualify for the postseason**
8	Miami Dolphins	East	10	6	0	.625	3–3	7–5	.467	.347	L1
9	Las Vegas Raiders	West	8	8	0	.500	4–2	6–6	.539	.477	W1
10 (Note: New England finished ahead of the LA Chargers based on head-to-head victory.)	New England Patriots	East	7	9	0	.438	3–3	6–6	.527	.429	W1
11	Los Angeles Chargers	West	7	9	0	.438	3–3	6–6	.482	.344	W4
12	Denver Broncos	West	5	11	0	.313	1–5	4–8	.566	.388	L3
13	Cincinnati Bengals	North	4	11	1	.281	1–5	4–8	.529	.438	L1
14	Houston Texans	South	4	12	0	.250	2–4	3–9	.541	.219	L5
15	New York Jets	East	2	14	0	.125	0–6	1–11	.594	.656	L1
16	Jacksonville Jaguars	South	1	15	0	.063	1–5	1–11	.549	.688	L15
**Tiebreakers** (Note: When breaking ties for three or more teams under the NFL's rules, they are first broken within divisions, then comparing only the highest ranked remaining team from each division.)

=== Statistics ===
==== Team leaders ====
Category	Player(s)	Value
Passing yards	Drew Lock	2,933
Passing touchdowns	Drew Lock	16
Rushing yards	Melvin Gordon	986
Rushing touchdowns	Melvin Gordon	9
Receptions	Noah Fant	62
Receiving yards	Jerry Jeudy	856
Receiving touchdowns	Tim Patrick	6
Points	Brandon McManus	108
Kickoff return yards	Diontae Spencer	281
Punt return yards	Diontae Spencer	253
Tackles	A. J. Johnson	124
Sacks	Malik Reed	8.0
Forced fumbles	Michael Ojemudia	4
Interceptions	Justin Simmons	5

Source for this section: Denver Broncos' official website.

==== League rankings ====
Offense
Category	Value	NFL rank (out of 32)
Total yards	335.6 YPG	23rd
Yards per play	5.2	24th
Rushing yards	119.9 YPG	13th
Yards per rush	4.3	16th
Passing yards	215.7 YPG	26th
Yards per pass	6.6	24th
Pass completions	317/556 (.570)	31st
Total touchdowns	35	29th
Rushing touchdowns	13	T–22nd
Receiving touchdowns	21	25th
Scoring	20.2 PPG	28th
Red Zone Touchdowns	24/45 (.533)	27th
Third down efficiency	82/212 (.387)	26th
Fourth down efficiency	4/15 (.267)	32nd
First downs per game	19.3	30th
Fewest sacks allowed	32	T–13th
Fewest giveaways	32	32nd
Fewest penalties	81	T–5th
Least penalty yardage	670	8th

Defense
Category	Value	NFL rank (out of 32)
Total yards	367.9 YPG	20th
Yards per play	5.6	18th
Rushing yards	130.0 YPG	25th
Yards per rush	4.8	29th
Passing yards	237.9 YPG	T–16th
Yards per pass	7.2	17th
Pass completions	374/567 (.660)	19th
Total touchdowns	47	T–19th
Rushing touchdowns	22	28th
Receiving touchdowns	21	T–2nd
Scoring	27.9 PPG	25th
Red Zone Touchdowns	29/61 (.475)	1st
Third down efficiency	88/219 (.402)	15th
Fourth down efficiency	7/14 (.500)	12th
First downs per game	20.8	10th
Sacks	42	9th
Takeaways	16	29th
Fewest penalties	106	31st
Least penalty yardage	952	29th

Special teams
Category	Value	NFL rank (out of 32)
Gross punting	46.1 YPP	10th
Kickoffs	61.3 YPK	25th
Punt returns	13.4 YPR	2nd
Kick returns	20.6 YPR	22nd
Punt coverage	8.1 YPR	15th
Kick coverage	29.9 YPR	31st

Source for this section: Pro-Football Reference.

== Awards and honors ==
Recipient	Award(s)
Drew Lock	Week 14: AFC FedEx Air Player of the Week
Brandon McManus	Week 4: AFC Special Teams Player of the Week; Week 6: AFC Special Teams Player of the Week
Diontae Spencer	Week 14: AFC Special Teams Player of the Week

=== Pro Bowl and All-Pro selections ===
Linebacker Bradley Chubb and safety Justin Simmons were selected to the 2021 Pro Bowl. It was the first selection for each player. The 2021 Pro Bowl would have occurred on January 31, 2021, at Allegiant Stadium in Paradise, Nevada; however, due to the COVID-19 pandemic, the Pro Bowl was held as a week-long virtual event, featuring the Pro Bowl rosters being played on the Madden NFL 21 video game. Offensive tackle Garett Bolles was voted to the 2020 All-Pro Team and named to the Second Team.

== Impact of the COVID-19 pandemic ==
=== Quarterbacks ===
On November 28, Adam Schefter reported that backup quarterback Jeff Driskel had tested positive for COVID-19, and that starter Drew Lock, as well as third and fourth quarterbacks Brett Rypien and Blake Bortles, had been in physical contact with Driskel without wearing protective masks. Accordingly, all four were placed in league-mandated quarantine and were deemed ineligible to play in the Week 12 (November 29) game vs. the New Orleans Saints. Undrafted wide receiver Kendall Hinton, who played quarterback at Wake Forest and was promoted from the practice squad, served as the emergency starter, with running back Royce Freeman as the backup. Lock, Rypien and Bortles were activated from the Reserve/COVID-19 list on December 1, and returned to the active roster in preparation for the team's Week 13 game at the Kansas City Chiefs, while Driskel returned to the active roster on December 16.

=== Other players ===
- July 28: Defensive tackle Kyle Peko was placed on the Reserve/Higher Risk Opt-Out list.
- July 30: Tight end Andrew Beck was placed on the COVID-19 reserve list. He returned to the active roster on December 5.
- August 3: Offensive tackle Ja'Wuan James opted out for the 2020 season.
- August 25: Defensive end Joel Heath was placed on the Reserve/Higher Risk Opt-Out list.
- October 30: Guard Graham Glasgow tested positive for COVID-19, two days ahead of the team's Week 8 game vs. the Los Angeles Chargers, resulting in the cancellation of practice that same day. He was subsequently placed on the Reserve/COVID-19 list, and returned to the active roster on November 11.
- November 4: Defensive end Shelby Harris was placed on the COVID-19 reserve list, and returned to the active roster on December 2.
- November 27: Wide receiver/return specialist Diontae Spencer was placed on the COVID-19 reserve list, and returned to the active roster on December 10.
- December 14: Placekicker Brandon McManus was placed on the COVID-19 reserve list, and returned to the active roster on December 22.

=== Coaching staff and Front office ===
- October 17: One day before the Broncos' Week 6 game at the New England Patriots, running backs coach Curtis Modkins tested positive for COVID-19. Despite not having any symptoms, he did not travel with the team to New England.
- October 30: Two days before the Broncos' Week 8 game vs. the Los Angeles Chargers, offensive line coach Mike Munchak was placed in COVID protocol, after he either tested positive himself or came in close contact with someone who tested positive for COVID-19.
- November 1: Defensive coordinator Ed Donatell tested positive for COVID-19. After missing six games which required a brief hospital stay, he made his return to the team during the Broncos' Week 14 win over the Carolina Panthers.
- November 3: President of football operations and general manager John Elway and team president Joe Ellis each tested positive for COVID-19, after they both reported "minor symptoms" to the medical team.

=== Team and league discipline ===
Broncos' head coach Vic Fangio was fined $100,000, and the team was fined an additional $250,000 by the NFL after Fangio failed to wear a face mask during a Week 2 game at the Pittsburgh Steelers. Later in the season, all of the team's quarterbacks—Drew Lock, Brett Rypien, Jeff Driskel and Blake Bortles—were fined an undisclosed amount, after failing to wear a mask during team meetings prior to a Week 12 game vs. the New Orleans Saints.

=== Fan attendance ===
Due to the COVID-19 pandemic, the Broncos' Week 1 home opener vs. the Tennessee Titans was played behind closed doors. As the result of an agreement with Governor of Colorado Jared Polis and the Colorado Department of Public Health and Environment, the Broncos admitted 5,226 fans (7% of Empower Field at Mile High's seating capacity) for the team's Week 3 game vs. the Tampa Bay Buccaneers, in which the remaining seats were filled out with cutouts of South Park characters. On October 5, the Broncos were approved to continue admitting 5,700 fans for each remaining home game, and had hopes of increasing spectator capacity later in the season. However, on November 20, the Broncos announced that their Week 11 game vs. the Miami Dolphins was their last with any spectators due to an uptick in positive COVID-19 cases in Colorado, with the final three home games played behind closed doors.
