= Kendall Hinton =

American football player (born 1997)

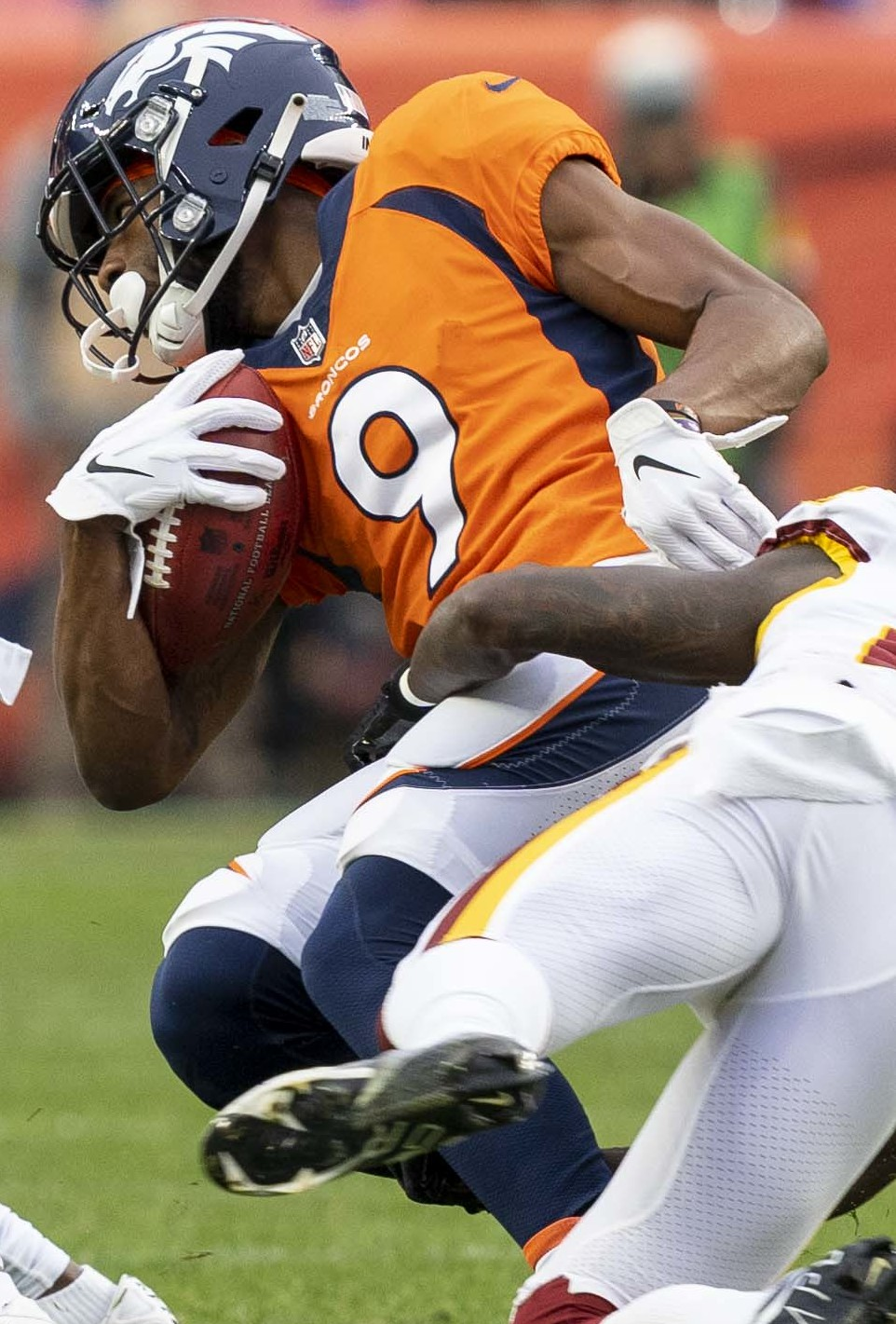
- Hinton with the Denver Broncos in 2021

Profile
- Position: Wide receiver

Personal information
- Born: February 19, 1997 (age 29); Durham, North Carolina, U.S.
- Listed height: 5 ft 11 in (1.80 m)
- Listed weight: 195 lb (88 kg)

Career information
- High school: Southern Durham
- College: Wake Forest (2015–2019)
- NFL draft: 2020: undrafted

Career history
- Denver Broncos (2020–2022)

Awards and highlights
- Third-team All-ACC (2019)

Career NFL statistics
- Passing attempts: 10
- Passing completions: 2
- Completion percentage: 20.0%
- TD–INT: 0–2
- Passing yards: 14
- Receptions: 39
- Receiving yards: 486
- Receiving touchdowns: 1
- Stats at Pro Football Reference

Kendall Hinton (born February 19, 1997) is an American professional football wide receiver. He played college football for the Wake Forest Demon Deacons as a quarterback and wide receiver before signing with the Broncos as an undrafted free agent in 2020. That season, he made an appearance as an emergency quarterback after the rest of the team's quarterbacks were placed in COVID-19 quarantine for a week. In doing so, Hinton became the first non-professional quarterback to play significant snaps at the position in an NFL game since running back Tom Matte with the Baltimore Colts in 1965.

== Early life ==
Hinton played quarterback at Southern Durham High School in Durham, North Carolina. As a high school junior, Hinton threw for 3,972 yards and 39 touchdowns en route to a NCHSAA 3AA state championship title.

== College career ==
Rated a three-star prospect by 247Sports and Rivals, Hinton committed to play college football for the Wake Forest Demon Deacons on June 11, 2014. As a true freshman in 2015, Hinton played in nine games and started in two of them. In the nine games, he threw for 929 yards and four touchdowns, while rushing for 390 yards and seven touchdowns. Against Army on September 19, Hinton replaced injured starting quarterback John Wolford in the first quarter of the game, and led the Demon Deacons to a 24–21 win by passing for 159 yards and two touchdowns. The next week against Indiana, Hinton made his first career start in place of Wolford, and had 245 yards passing along with 57 yards rushing and two touchdowns in the 31–24 loss. Hinton's 245 passing yards set a Wake Forest school record for most passing yards by a player in his first career start. He started again the following week against Florida State on October 3, throwing for 215 yards in a loss.

As a sophomore, Hinton suffered a sprained ankle in the Demon Deacons Week 3 game against Delaware. Initially expected to only miss 2–4 weeks, Hinton did not play for the remainder of the season and was granted a medical redshirt. As a redshirt sophomore, Hinton served as the primary backup quarterback to John Wolford in 2017, starting one game against Clemson in place of an injured Wolford. Hinton completed 14 of 30 passes for 203 yards and 2 touchdowns in the 28–14 loss.

As a junior he was projected to be the starting quarterback entering the season, Hinton was suspended for the first three games of the season for violating team rules. Following his return from suspension, Hinton was named the backup quarterback to true freshman Sam Hartman. Despite entering the transfer portal at the end of his redshirt junior year, Hinton opted to return to Wake Forest for his redshirt senior season. In his redshirt senior season, Hinton transitioned to playing slot receiver full-time, racking up 73 receptions for 1,001 yards and four touchdowns.

== Professional career ==
Pre-draft measurables
Height	Weight	Arm length	Hand span
5 ft 10 3/8 in (1.79 m)	193 lb (88 kg)	30 1/2 in (0.77 m)	9 7/8 in (0.25 m)
All values from Pro Day

Hinton signed with the Denver Broncos as an undrafted free agent on April 26, 2020. He was waived on September 5, but re-signed with their practice squad on November 4. In Week 12, all four Broncos quarterbacks were ruled ineligible to play against the New Orleans Saints due to COVID-19 pandemic protocols, so Hinton was elevated to the active roster as an emergency quarterback option for the team, as his time as a quarterback at Wake Forest made him the only player on the Broncos roster with experience at the position. The Broncos could not sign a free agent quarterback as NFL COVID protocols required new signees to sit out six days before joining their new team.

Out of his nine attempts, Hinton only completed a single 13-yard pass to tight end Noah Fant, while also throwing two interceptions as the Broncos lost 31–3. Hinton reverted to the practice squad following the game, and signed a reserve/futures contract with the team on January 4, 2021.

On August 31, 2021, Hinton was waived by the Broncos and re-signed to the practice squad the next day. He was promoted to the active roster on September 14. In Week 5 against the Pittsburgh Steelers, Hinton caught his first career touchdown pass in the Broncos' 27–19 loss.

On August 30, 2022, Hinton was waived by the Broncos and signed to the practice squad the next day. He was promoted to the active roster on September 17 for the Broncos' Week 2 game against the Houston Texans, in which he caught one pass for 20 yards en route to a 16–9 win. On September 19, he reverted to the practice squad. On September 24, Hinton was once again elevated to the active roster for the Broncos' Week 3 game against the San Francisco 49ers, in which he recorded one reception for 27 yards in an 11–10 win. He was signed to the active roster on October 10.

On July 28, 2023, Hinton was activated from the physically unable to perform list. He was waived by the Broncos August 23.

== NFL career statistics ==
Year	Team	Games		Receiving					Rushing					Returning					Passing								Sacks		Fumbles	
Year	Team	GP	GS	Rec	Yds	Avg	Lng	TD	Att	Yds	Avg	Lng	TD	Ret	Yds	Avg	Lng	TD	Cmp	Att	Pct	Yds	Avg	TD	Int	Rtg	Sck	SckY	Fum	Lost
2020	DEN	1	0	—	—	—	—	—	2	7	3.5	5	0	—	—	—	—	—	1	9	11.1	13	1.4	0	2	0.0	1	1	0	0
2021	DEN	16	1	15	175	11.7	40	1	—	—	—	—	—	2	24	12.0	15	0	1	1	100.0	1	1.0	0	0	79.2	0	0	0	0
2022	DEN	12	5	24	311	13.0	35	0	2	13	6.5	13	0	—	—	—	—	—	—	—	—	—	—	—	—	—	—	—	0	0
Career		29	6	39	486	12.5	40	1	4	20	5.0	13	0	2	24	12.0	15	0	2	10	20.0	14	1.4	0	2	0.0	1	1	0	0
