= Sam Martin (American football) =

American football player (born 1990)

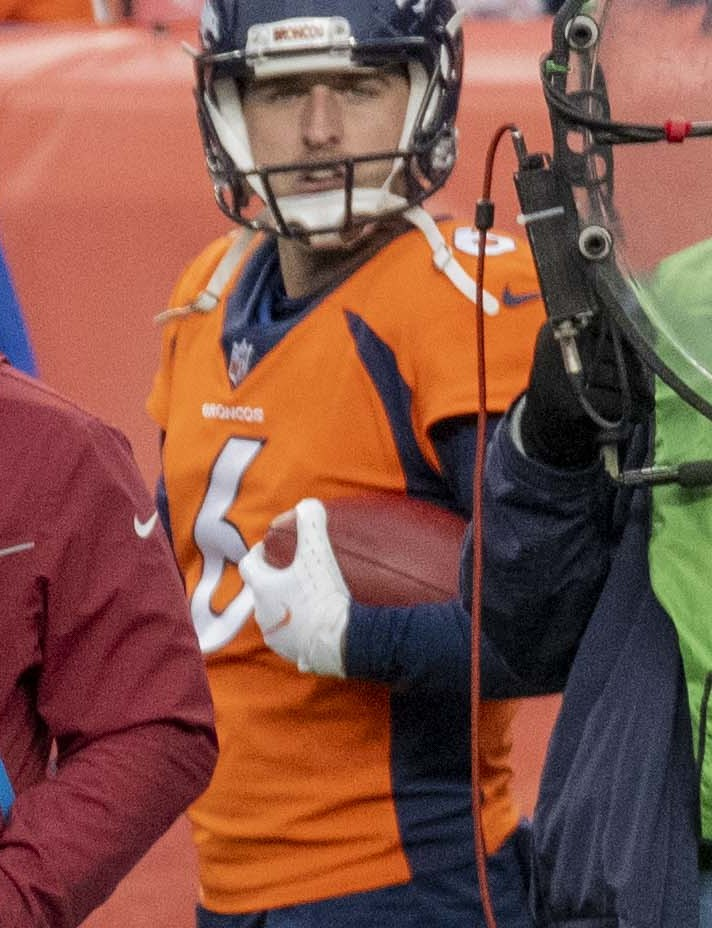
- Martin with the Denver Broncos in 2021

No. 6 – Carolina Panthers
- Position: Punter / Kickoff specialist
- Roster status: Active

Personal information
- Born: February 27, 1990 (age 36); Fayetteville, Georgia, U.S.
- Listed height: 6 ft 1 in (1.85 m)
- Listed weight: 207 lb (94 kg)

Career information
- High school: Starr's Mill (Fayetteville)
- College: Appalachian State (2008–2012)
- NFL draft: 2013: 5th round, 165th overall pick

Career history
- Detroit Lions (2013–2019); Denver Broncos (2020–2021); Buffalo Bills (2022–2024); Carolina Panthers (2025–present)

Awards and highlights
- PFWA All-Rookie Team (2013)

Career NFL statistics as of Week 10, 2026
- Punts: 843
- Punting yards: 39,020
- Punting average: 46.3
- Longest punt: 72
- Inside 20: 331
- Touchbacks: 259
- Stats at Pro Football Reference

Sam Joseph Martin (born February 27, 1990) is an American professional football punter and kickoff specialist for the Carolina Panthers of the National Football League (NFL). He played college football for the Appalachian State Mountaineers, and was selected by the Detroit Lions in the fifth round of the 2013 NFL draft.

== Early life ==
Martin was lettered for soccer for four years and also received all-state recognition in his junior season at Starr's Mill High School.

== College career ==
In his senior season at Appalachian State University, he was selected to the Associated Press All-America First team. He also was named to the first-team All-America by College Sports Journal and third-team all-America by The Sports Network in his senior season.

== Professional career ==
Pre-draft measurables
Height	Weight	Arm length	Hand span	Wingspan
6 ft 0 1/8 in (1.83 m)	206 lb (93 kg)	30 in (0.76 m)	8 1/2 in (0.22 m)	6 ft 0 1/4 in (1.84 m)
All values from Pro Day

=== Detroit Lions ===
Martin was selected by the Detroit Lions in the fifth round of the 2013 NFL draft. He was named to the PFWA All-Rookie Team.

In Week 12 of the 2015 season, Martin was awarded as the NFC Special Teams Player of the Week for four punts totaling 181 yards and only three punt return yards.

Martin signed a four-year contract extension with the Lions on September 9, 2016. At the conclusion of the 2016 NFL season, Martin was named as an alternate for the 2017 Pro Bowl, but did not participate in the game.

On September 2, 2017, Martin was placed on the non-football injury list after suffering an ankle injury during the offseason. He was activated to the active roster on October 28, 2017, for the team's Week 8 game against the Pittsburgh Steelers.

=== Denver Broncos ===
On March 30, 2020, Martin signed a three-year, $7.05 million deal with the Denver Broncos.

Martin was released by the Broncos on August 29, 2022, after he refused to take a pay cut.

=== Buffalo Bills ===
On August 31, 2022, Martin signed a one-year deal with the Buffalo Bills. He signed a three-year, $7.5 million contract extension on March 13, 2023.

=== Carolina Panthers ===
On March 11, 2025, the Carolina Panthers signed Martin to a one-year contract. In Week 7, Martin had six punts with a long of 68 yards, with four punts landing inside the 20-yard line in a 13–6 win over the New York Jets, earning NFC Special Teams Player of the Week.

On March 16, 2026, Martin re-signed with the Panthers on a one-year, $5 million contract.

== NFL career statistics ==
Legend
**Bold**	Career high

=== Regular season ===
Year	Team	Punting									
Year	Team	GP	Punts	Yds	Net Yds	Lng	Avg	Net Avg	Blk	Ins20	TB
2013	DET	16	72	3,399	2,949	**72**	47.2	40.4	**1**	22	**10**
2014	DET	16	68	3,138	2,727	71	46.1	40.1	0	29	5
2015	DET	16	**80**	**3,679**	**3,356**	66	46.0	42.0	0	25	3
2016	DET	16	62	3,010	2,740	63	**48.5**	**44.2**	0	23	3
2017	DET	10	41	1,779	1,543	64	43.4	37.6	0	13	6
2018	DET	16	74	3,310	2,898	61	44.7	39.2	0	**32**	4
2019	DET	16	76	3,445	3,175	62	45.3	41.8	0	31	7
2020	DEN	16	65	3,040	2,734	69	46.8	41.4	**1**	19	4
2021	DEN	**17**	67	3,083	2,869	68	46.0	42.8	0	28	3
2022	BUF	16	45	2,146	1,895	67	47.7	41.2	**1**	16	5
2023	BUF	**17**	51	2,334	2,030	70	45.8	39.8	0	24	3
2024	BUF	**17**	54	2,523	2,189	65	46.7	39.8	**1**	25	5
2025	CAR	**17**	56	2,642	2,269	68	47.2	40.5	0	27	3
2026	CAR	9	32	1,492	1,342	61	46.6	41.9	0	17	2
Career		215	843	39,020	34,716	72	46.3	41.0	4	331	63

=== Playoffs ===
Year	Team	Punting									
Year	Team	GP	Punts	Yds	Net Yds	Lng	Avg	Net Avg	Blk	Ins20	TB
2014	DET	1	4	142	142	48	35.5	35.5	0	2	0
2016	DET	1	5	232	227	55	46.4	45.4	0	2	0
2022	BUF	2	**9**	**418**	**320**	53	46.4	35.6	0	**3**	**1**
2023	BUF	2	5	223	196	52	44.6	39.2	0	2	0
2024	BUF	**3**	6	296	219	56	49.3	36.5	0	**3**	**1**
2025	CAR	1	3	163	165	**58**	**54.3**	**55.0**	0	**3**	0
Career		10	32	1,474	1,269	56	46.8	39.6	0	12	2
