= Austin Calitro =

American football player (born 1994)

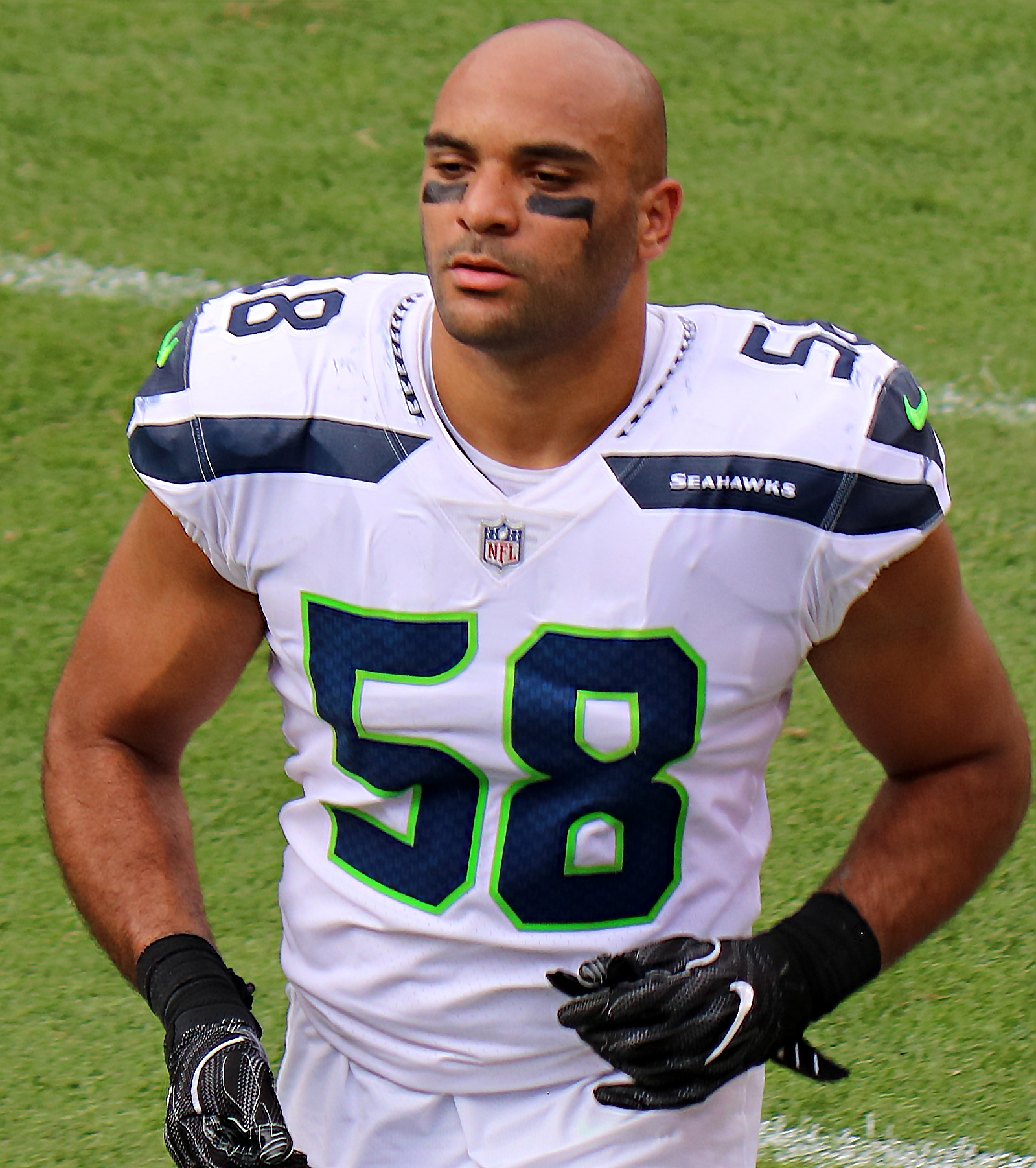
- Calitro with the Seattle Seahawks in 2018

No. 58, 53, 48, 59
- Position: Linebacker

Personal information
- Born: January 10, 1994 (age 32); Orlando, Florida, U.S.
- Listed height: 6 ft 0 in (1.83 m)
- Listed weight: 240 lb (109 kg)

Career information
- High school: Danbury (Danbury, Connecticut)
- College: Villanova
- NFL draft: 2017: undrafted

Career history
- New York Jets (2017)*; San Francisco 49ers (2017)*; Seattle Seahawks (2017)*; Cleveland Browns (2017)*; Seattle Seahawks (2018); Jacksonville Jaguars (2019); Cincinnati Bengals (2020)*; Denver Broncos (2020); Chicago Bears (2021)*; Cincinnati Bengals (2021); New York Giants (2022); Las Vegas Raiders (2022)
- * Offseason or practice squad member only

Career NFL statistics
- Total tackles: 102
- Sacks: 1.5
- Pass deflections: 2
- Stats at Pro Football Reference

Austin Calitro (born January 10, 1994) is an American former professional football player who was a linebacker in the National Football League (NFL). He played college football for the Villanova Wildcats.

== College career ==
Calitro was selected to the All-CAA Football first-team. He also led Villanova in total tackles with 90 and forced fumbles with 3 in his junior season.

== Professional career ==
Pre-draft measurables
Height	Weight	Arm length	Hand span	40-yard dash	10-yard split	20-yard split	20-yard shuttle	Three-cone drill	Vertical jump	Broad jump	Bench press
6 ft 0 1/2 in (1.84 m)	239 lb (108 kg)	32 1/4 in (0.82 m)	9 3/8 in (0.24 m)	4.67 s	1.64 s	2.71 s	4.31 s	6.96 s	34.0 in (0.86 m)	9 ft 3 in (2.82 m)	24 reps
All values from Pro Day

=== New York Jets ===
Calitro signed with the New York Jets as an undrafted free agent on May 5, 2017. He was waived by the Jets on May 15, 2017.

=== San Francisco 49ers ===
On August 7, 2017, Calitro signed with the San Francisco 49ers. He was waived on September 2, 2017.

=== Seattle Seahawks (first stint) ===
On September 4, 2017, Calitro was signed to the Seattle Seahawks' practice squad. He was released on September 19, 2017.

=== Cleveland Browns ===
On October 3, 2017, Calitro was signed to the Cleveland Browns' practice squad. He signed a reserve/future contract with the Browns on January 1, 2018.

On May 18, 2018, Calitro was waived by the Browns.

=== Seattle Seahawks (second stint) ===
On June 13, 2018, Calitro signed with the Seattle Seahawks. He played in his first NFL game on September 9, 2018, in a 27–24 loss to the Denver Broncos. He made five tackles. On September 17, he started against the Chicago Bears on Monday Night Football in week 2.

On September 2, 2019, Calitro was waived by the Seahawks.

=== Jacksonville Jaguars ===
On September 3, 2019, Calitro was claimed off waivers by the Jacksonville Jaguars.

Calitro re-signed with the Jaguars on April 22, 2020. On April 27, 2020, he was waived.

=== Cincinnati Bengals (first stint) ===
On April 28, 2020, Calitro was claimed off waivers by the Cincinnati Bengals.

=== Denver Broncos ===
On September 4, 2020, Calitro was traded to the Denver Broncos for Christian Covington. He was placed on injured reserve on September 28, 2020. He was activated on October 31.

=== Chicago Bears ===
On May 17, 2021, Calitro signed with the Chicago Bears. He was placed on injured reserve on August 22, 2021, and released three days later.

=== Cincinnati Bengals (second stint) ===
On November 15, 2021, Calitro was signed to the Cincinnati Bengals practice squad. He was promoted to the active roster on December 27. He was waived on January 10, 2022, and re-signed to the practice squad.

=== New York Giants ===
On July 28, 2022, Calitro was signed by the New York Giants. On November 23, 2022, he was waived.

=== Las Vegas Raiders ===
On December 6, 2022, Calitro was signed by the Las Vegas Raiders' practice squad. He was released on December 21. He was re-signed to the practice squad on December 27.
