= Kyle Peko =

American football player (born 1993)

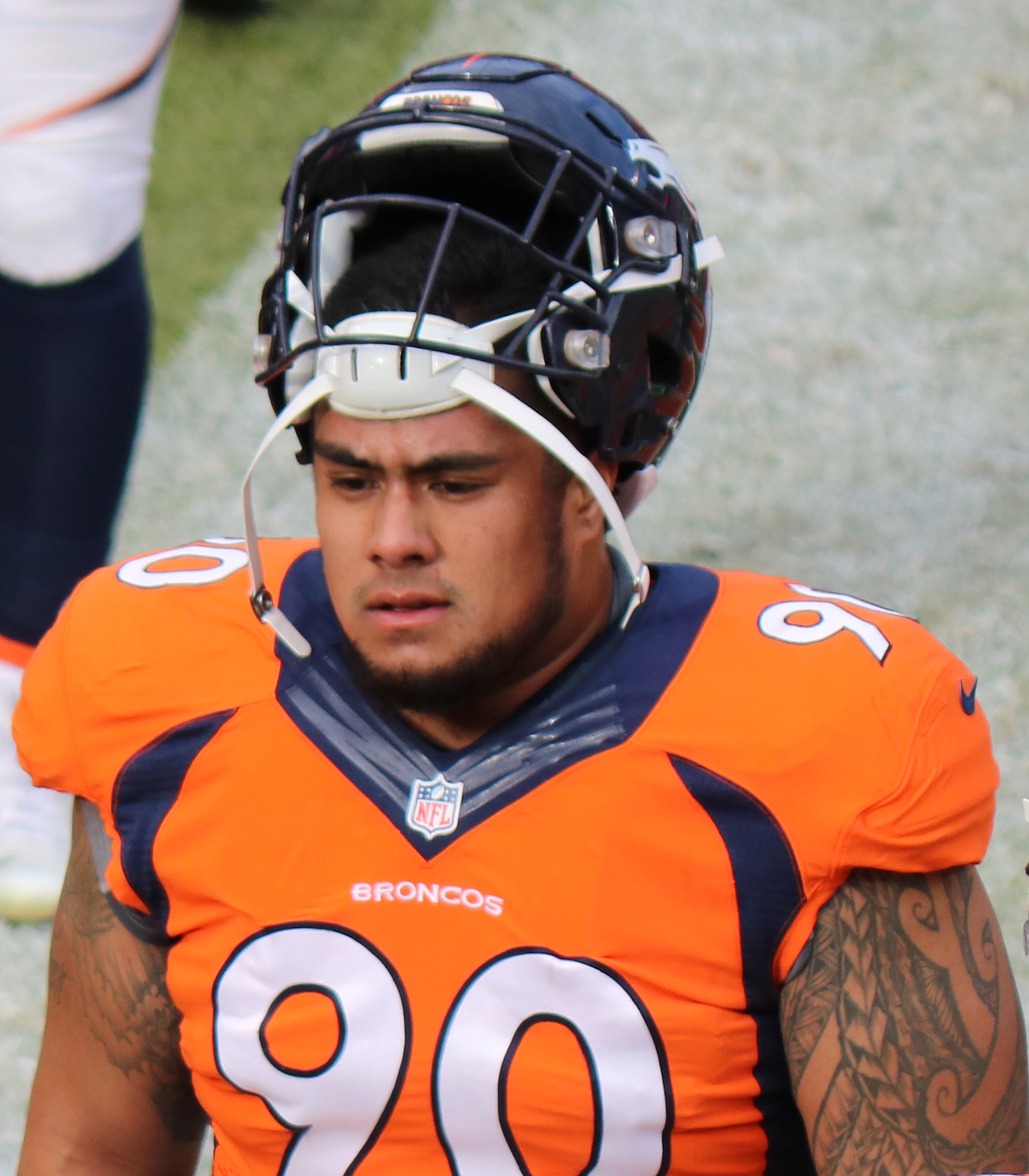
- Peko with the Denver Broncos in 2016

Profile
- Position: Nose tackle

Personal information
- Born: July 23, 1993 (age 33); La Habra, California, U.S.
- Listed height: 6 ft 1 in (1.85 m)
- Listed weight: 305 lb (138 kg)

Career information
- High school: La Habra
- College: Cerritos (2011–2012); Oregon State (2014–2015)
- NFL draft: 2016: undrafted

Career history
- Denver Broncos (2016–2018); Buffalo Bills (2018–2019); Indianapolis Colts (2019); Denver Broncos (2019–2020); Tennessee Titans (2021); Las Vegas Raiders (2022); Tennessee Titans (2023); Detroit Lions (2024); New England Patriots (2025)*; Los Angeles Chargers (2025)*
- * Offseason or practice squad member only

Career NFL statistics as of 2025
- Total tackles: 58
- Sacks: 2.0
- Pass deflections: 2
- Forced fumbles: 1
- Stats at Pro Football Reference

Kyle Peko (born July 23, 1993) is an American professional football nose tackle. He played college football for the Cerritos Falcons and Oregon State Beavers. Peko signed with the Denver Broncos as an undrafted free agent following the 2016 NFL draft.

== Professional career ==
Pre-draft measurables
Height	Weight	Arm length	Hand span	40-yard dash	10-yard split	20-yard split	20-yard shuttle	Three-cone drill	Vertical jump	Broad jump	Bench press
6 ft 1 in (1.85 m)	298 lb (135 kg)	32 3/4 in (0.83 m)	9 1/4 in (0.23 m)	5.13 s	1.80 s	2.97 s	4.50 s	7.30 s	32.5 in (0.83 m)	9 ft 8 in (2.95 m)	31 reps
All values from Pro Day

=== Denver Broncos (first stint) ===
On May 3, 2016, Peko signed with the Denver Broncos as an undrafted free agent following the 2016 NFL draft. On September 20, he was released by the Broncos, and re-signed to the practice squad on September 22. He was promoted to the active roster on December 28.

During the 2017 season, Peko was involved in multiple transactions; he was signed and released five times.

On September 1, 2018, Peko was waived by the Broncos and was signed to the practice squad the next day. He was released on September 11.

=== Buffalo Bills ===
On September 12, 2018, Peko was signed to the Buffalo Bills' practice squad. He signed a reserve/future contract with the Bills on December 31.

On August 31, 2019, Peko was waived by the Bills and was signed to the practice squad the next day. He was promoted to the active roster on September 24, and was waived on November 2.

=== Indianapolis Colts ===
On November 4, 2019, Peko was claimed off waivers by the Indianapolis Colts, but was waived five days later and re-signed to the practice squad.

=== Denver Broncos (second stint) ===
On December 14, 2019, Peko was signed by the Broncos off the Colts' practice squad. On July 28, 2020, Peko announced he was opting out of the 2020 season due to the COVID-19 pandemic.

He was released after the season on February 18, 2021.

=== Tennessee Titans (first stint) ===
On July 26, 2021, Peko signed with the Tennessee Titans. He was placed on injured reserve on August 26. He was released on September 6, and re-signed to the practice squad on October 13. He was promoted to the active roster on November 17.

Peko put up 1.0 sack in each of the last two games of the season, the only sacks in his career to date. He also put up the only forced fumble in his career in the first of those last two games, a 34–3 win against the Miami Dolphins.

=== Las Vegas Raiders ===
On March 22, 2022, Peko signed with the Las Vegas Raiders. He was released on August 30, and re-signed to the practice squad on September 5. On September 13, Peko was released from the practice squad and re-signed on October 26. On December 6, Peko was signed to the Raiders' active roster.

On July 25, 2023, Peko re-signed with the Raiders. He was released on August 13.

=== Tennessee Titans (second stint) ===
On August 14, 2023, Peko signed with the Titans. He was released on August 29 and re-signed to the practice squad. He was promoted to the active roster on September 19.

In Week 13 against the Indianapolis Colts, Peko put on a season-best performance with 2 QB hits and 1 pass defensed against quarterback Gardner Minshew; the Titans lost 31–28 in overtime.

Peko was placed on injured reserve on December 13, where he remained the rest of the season.

=== Detroit Lions ===
On May 7, 2024, Peko signed with the Detroit Lions. He was released on August 27, and re-signed to the practice squad. He was promoted to the active roster on September 11.

On October 13, 2024, against the Dallas Cowboys in Week 6, Peko suffered a torn pectoral muscle that resulted in him being placed on injured reserve after undergoing season–ending surgery.

=== New England Patriots ===
On August 11, 2025, Peko signed with the New England Patriots. He was released on August 22.

=== Los Angeles Chargers ===
On October 28, 2025, Peko signed with the Los Angeles Chargers' practice squad.

== Personal life ==
Peko is the younger cousin of nose tackle Domata Peko, who was drafted by the Cincinnati Bengals in 2006; the two became teammates on the Denver Broncos in 2017.

In 2019, Peko's wife, Giuliana, was diagnosed with cancer, specifically stage 3 Hodgkin's lymphoma, and Kyle was excused for the first day of Bills' training camp. Peko later announced that her treatment was successful and she was cancer-free. They have two children together.
