= Essang Bassey =

American football player (born 1998)

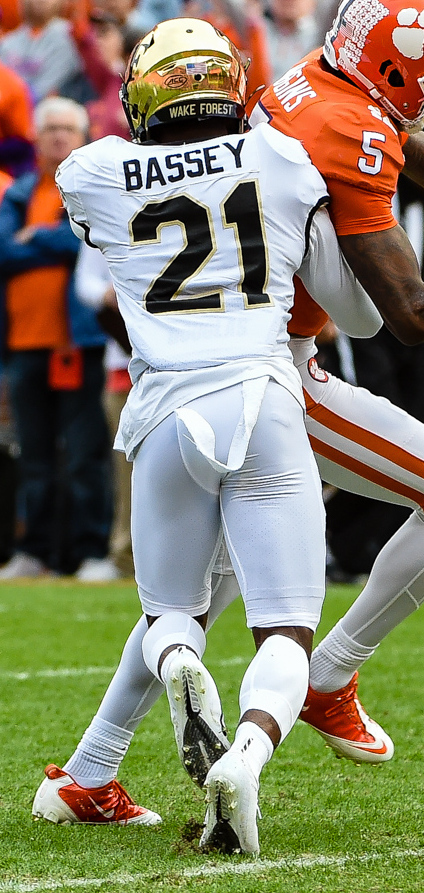
- Bassey with the Wake Forest Demon Deacons in 2019

Profile
- Position: Cornerback

Personal information
- Born: August 12, 1998 (age 28); Columbus, Georgia, U.S.
- Listed height: 5 ft 10 in (1.78 m)
- Listed weight: 190 lb (86 kg)

Career information
- High school: Columbus
- College: Wake Forest (2016–2019)
- NFL draft: 2020: undrafted

Career history
- Denver Broncos (2020–2021); Los Angeles Chargers (2021); Denver Broncos (2022–2023); Los Angeles Chargers (2023); Detroit Lions (2024)*; Washington Commanders (2025)*; BC Lions (2026)*
- * Offseason or practice squad member only

Awards and highlights
- Second-team All-ACC (2018); Third-team All-ACC (2019)

Career NFL statistics as of 2024
- Tackles: 60
- Fumble recoveries: 1
- Pass deflections: 7
- Interceptions: 1
- Stats at Pro Football Reference

Essang Bassey (born August 12, 1998) is an American professional football cornerback. He played college football for the Wake Forest Demon Deacons and was signed by the Denver Broncos as an undrafted free agent in 2020. Bassey has also been a member of the Los Angeles Chargers, Detroit Lions, Washington Commanders, and the BC Lions of the Canadian Football League (CFL).

== Early life ==
Playing both offense and defense at Columbus High School in Georgia, Bassey split time between cornerback, wide receiver and running back. He also was an explosive kick returner, averaging 30 yards per return during his senior season. Bassey considered interest from Wofford, Tulane, Georgia Southern and Wake Forest until going to Winston-Salem for a camp and committing to Wake Forest three days later, citing the program's passion for the game and standards off the field.

== College career ==
Bassey received playing time during his true freshman season in every game in a reserve capacity, accruing 17 tackles.

As a sophomore, Bassey led the Wake Forest defense in snaps played and collected 66 tackles and three interceptions. He was also named an honorable mention on the All-Atlantic Coast Conference (ACC) team after the season.

During his junior season, analysts noted his speed and technique as strong points of his game. Bassey was named second-team All-ACC.

== Professional career ==
Pre-draft measurables
| Height | Weight | Arm length | Hand span | 40-yard dash | 10-yard split | 20-yard split | 20-yard shuttle | Three-cone drill | Vertical jump | Broad jump | Bench press |
|---|---|---|---|---|---|---|---|---|---|---|---|
| 5 ft 9 3/8 in (1.76 m) | 191 lb (87 kg) | 31 in (0.79 m) | 7 7/8 in (0.20 m) | 4.46 s | 1.53 s | 2.60 s | 4.13 s | 6.95 s | 39.5 in (1.00 m) | 10 ft 8 in (3.25 m) | 12 reps |
All values from NFL Combine

=== Denver Broncos (first stint) ===
Bassey signed with the Denver Broncos as an undrafted free agent on April 25, 2020. He chose the Broncos over the Cincinnati Bengals and Baltimore Ravens, who also tried to sign Bassey. In Week 12 against the New Orleans Saints, Bassey recorded his first career interception off a pass thrown by Taysom Hill during the 31–3 loss. He was placed on injured reserve on December 9, 2020.

On September 1, 2021, Bassey was placed on the reserve/physically unable to perform list to start the season. He was activated on November 13. He was waived on December 18.

=== Los Angeles Chargers ===
On December 20, 2021, Bassey was claimed off waivers by the Los Angeles Chargers. He was waived on January 8, 2022.

=== Denver Broncos (second stint) ===
On January 10, 2022, Bassey was claimed off waivers by the Broncos. He was waived on September 1, and re-signed to the practice squad. He was promoted to the active roster on September 14.

On March 22, 2023, Bassey re-signed with the Broncos. He was released on October 3.

=== Los Angeles Chargers (second stint) ===
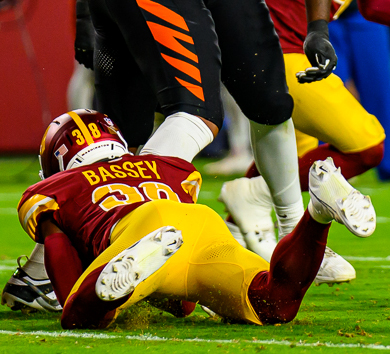
Bassey with the Washington Commanders in 2025

On October 4, 2023, the Chargers claimed Bassey off of waivers after trading J. C. Jackson to the New England Patriots.

=== Detroit Lions ===
On August 13, 2024, Bassey signed with the Detroit Lions. He was released on August 27.

=== Washington Commanders ===
On August 11, 2025, Bassey signed with the Washington Commanders. He was released by the Commanders on August 25.

=== BC Lions ===
On April 2, 2026, Bassey signed as a defensive back with the BC Lions of the Canadian Football League (CFL). On May 31, 2026, Bassey was released by Lions, during their final cuts before the start of the 2026 CFL season.

== Personal life ==
Bassey's parents were Nigerian immigrants. He is a Christian.
